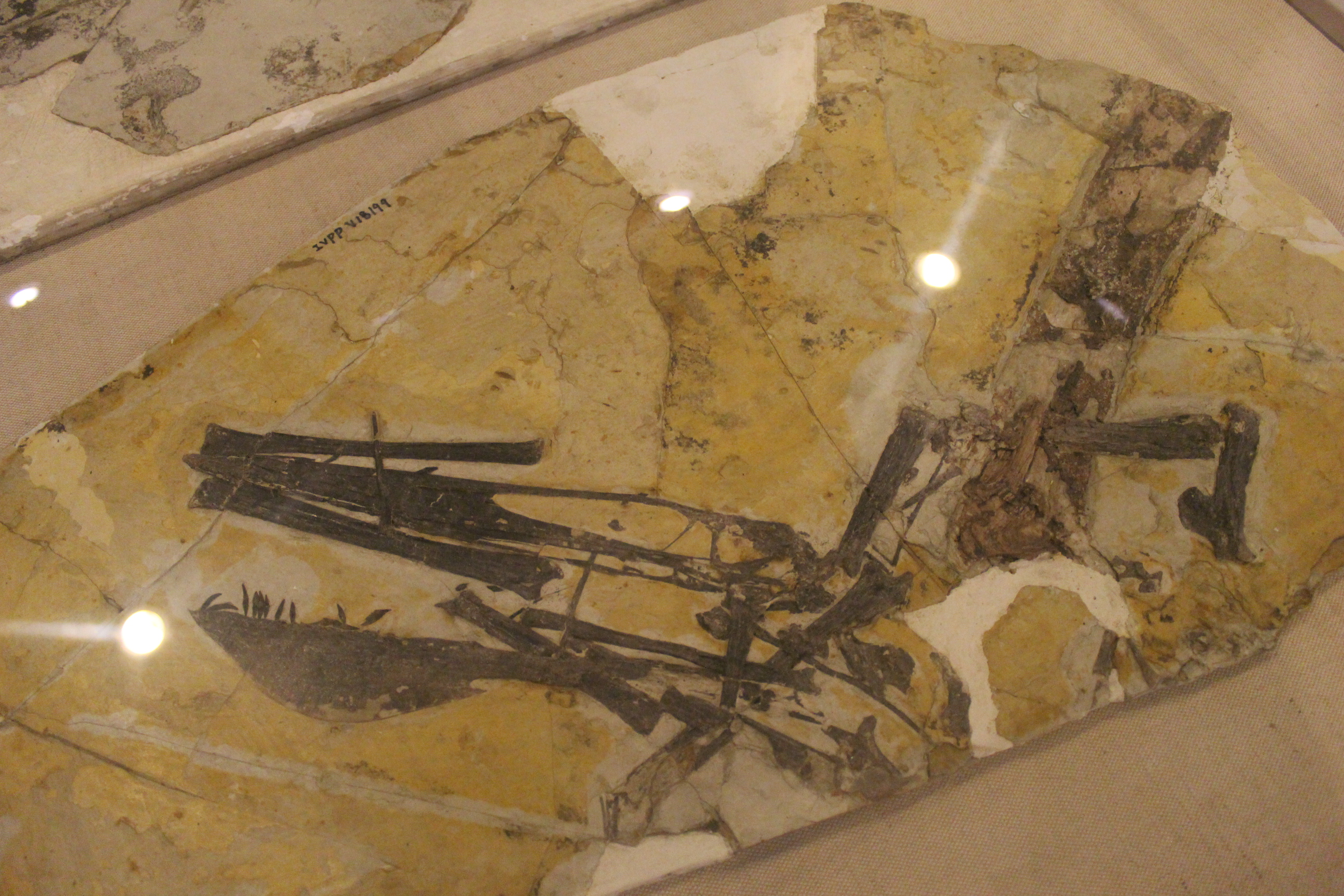
- I. avatar holotype, Paleozoological Museum of China

Scientific classification
- Kingdom: Animalia
- Phylum: Chordata
- Order: †Pterosauria
- Suborder: †Pterodactyloidea
- Superfamily: †Ornithocheiroidea
- Clade: †Lanceodontia
- Family: †Lonchodraconidae
- Genus: †Ikrandraco; Wang et al., 2020

Type species
- †Ikrandraco avatar Wang et al., 2020

Other species
- †I. machaerorhynchus (Seeley, 1870) Averianov, 2020

Synonyms
- Synonyms of I. machaerorhynchus: Ornithocheirus machaerorhynchus Seeley, 1870; Lonchodectes machaerorhynchus (Seeley, 1870); Lonchodraco machaerorhynchus (Seeley, 1870); Ornithocheirus microdon Seeley, 1870; Lonchodectes microdon (Seeley, 1870); Lonchodraco microdon (Seeley, 1870); Pterodactylus oweni Seeley, 1864; Ornithocheirus oweni (Seeley, 1864)

= Ikrandraco =

Ikrandraco Temporal range: Early Cretaceous, 120 Ma

Genus of lonchodraconid pterosaur from the Early Cretaceous

Ikrandraco ("Ikran [a flying creature from Avatar with a crest on the lower jaw] dragon") is a genus of lonchodraconid pterodactyloid pterosaur known from the Lower Cretaceous Jiufotang Formation of northeastern China, and the Cambridge Greensand of England. It is notable for its unusual skull, which features a crest on the lower jaw.

== Discovery and naming ==
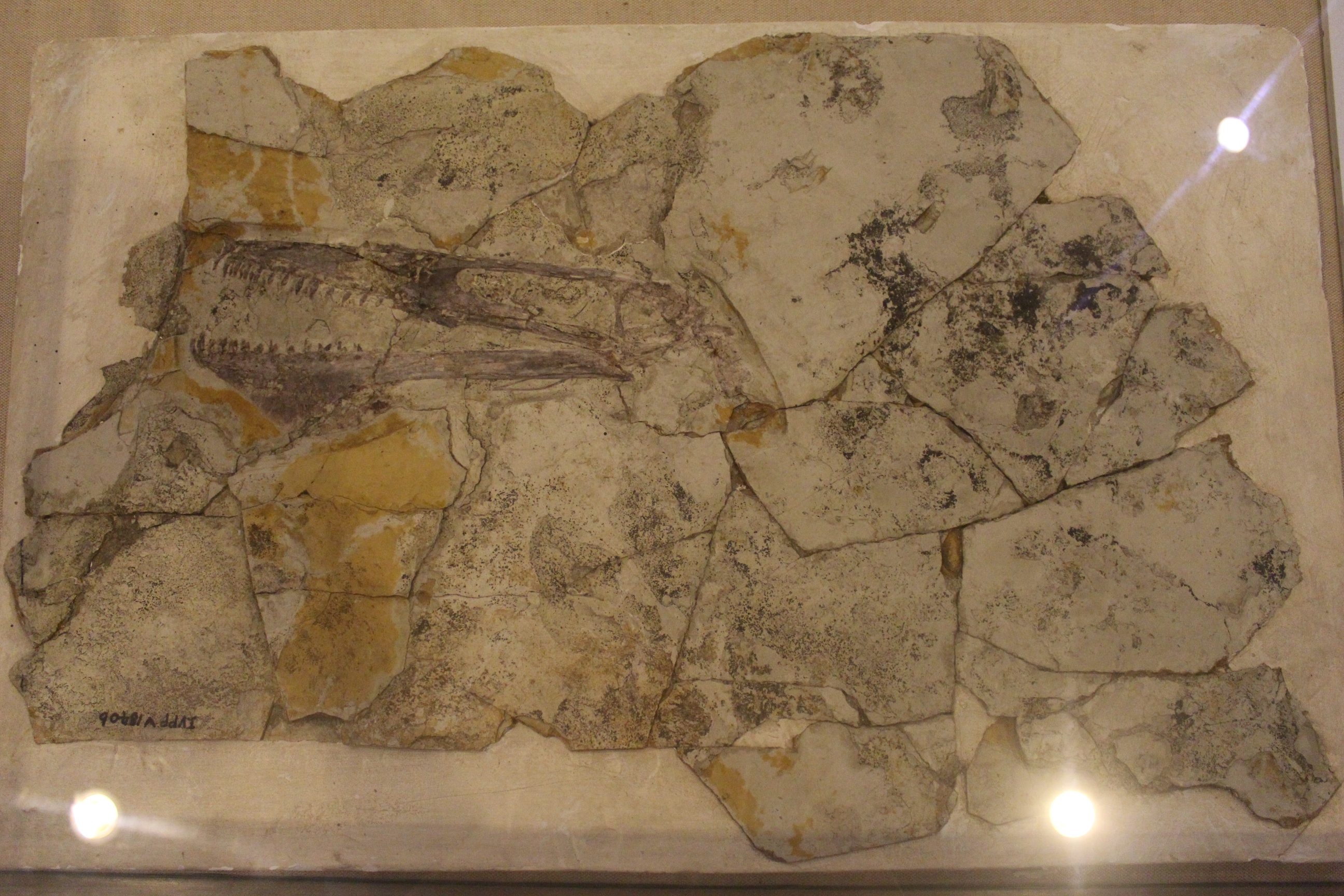
Referred specimen of I. avatar (IVPP 18406), Paleozoological Museum of China

The type species, Ikrandraco avatar is based on specimen IVPP V18199, a partial skeleton including the skull and jaws, several neck vertebrae, a partial sternal plate, parts of both wings, and part of a foot. A second specimen, IVPP 18406, has also been assigned to Ikrandraco; it consists of a skull and jaws and the first three neck vertebrae. Both specimens come from the Aptian-age Lower Cretaceous Jiufotang Formation of Liaoning, with an estimated date of 120 million years ago. The type species is I. avatar, a second reference to James Cameron’s “Avatar”. It was described in 2014 by Wang Xiaolin and colleagues, but was not properly named according to ICZN rules until 2020.

In 1869, British paleontologist Harry Govier Seeley assigned remains he found to a new species of pterosaur called Ptenodactylus machaerorhynchus, at the same time disclaiming the name which makes it invalid by modern standards. In 1870, Seeley had realized that the generic name Ptenodactylus had been preoccupied and renamed the species into Ornithocheirus machaerorhynchus. The specific name means "sabre snout" in Greek. In 1914, Hooley renamed it into Lonchodectes machaerorhynchus. Its holotype, CAMSM B54855, was found near Cambridge, in a layer of the Cambridge Greensand dating from the Cenomanian but containing reworked fossils from the Albian. It consists of the rear end of a symphysis of the lower jaws.

Also in 1869, Seeley informally named "Ptenodactylus microdon". In 1870, he formally named it Ornithocheirus microdon, "small tooth", Hooley (1914) transferred this species to Lonchodectes to form the new combination Lonchodectes microdon. Its holotype, CAMSM B54486, has its provenance in the Cambridge Greensand and consists of the front of a snout. The type specimen of the species Ornithocheirus oweni, CAMSM B 54439, initially described by Seeley in 1864 as Pterodactylus oweni, was synonymized with microdon by Unwin in 2001, and later in 2013, Rodrigues & Kellner agreed with this synonymy.

In 2013, paleontologists Taissa Rodrigues and Alexander Kellner made an extensive review of the species of Ornithocheirus, and stated that the generic name Lonchodectes would have been a nomen dubium, and therefore reassigned both Lonchodectes machaerorhynchus and L. microdon into the genus Lonchodraco, creating Lonchodraco machaerorhynchus and L. microdon.

In his review of Lonchodectidae, Alexander Averianov reassigned Lonchodraco machaerorhynchus to Ikrandraco, and also declared Lonchodraco microdon (including O. oweni) a junior synonym of I. machaerorhynchus.

== Description ==
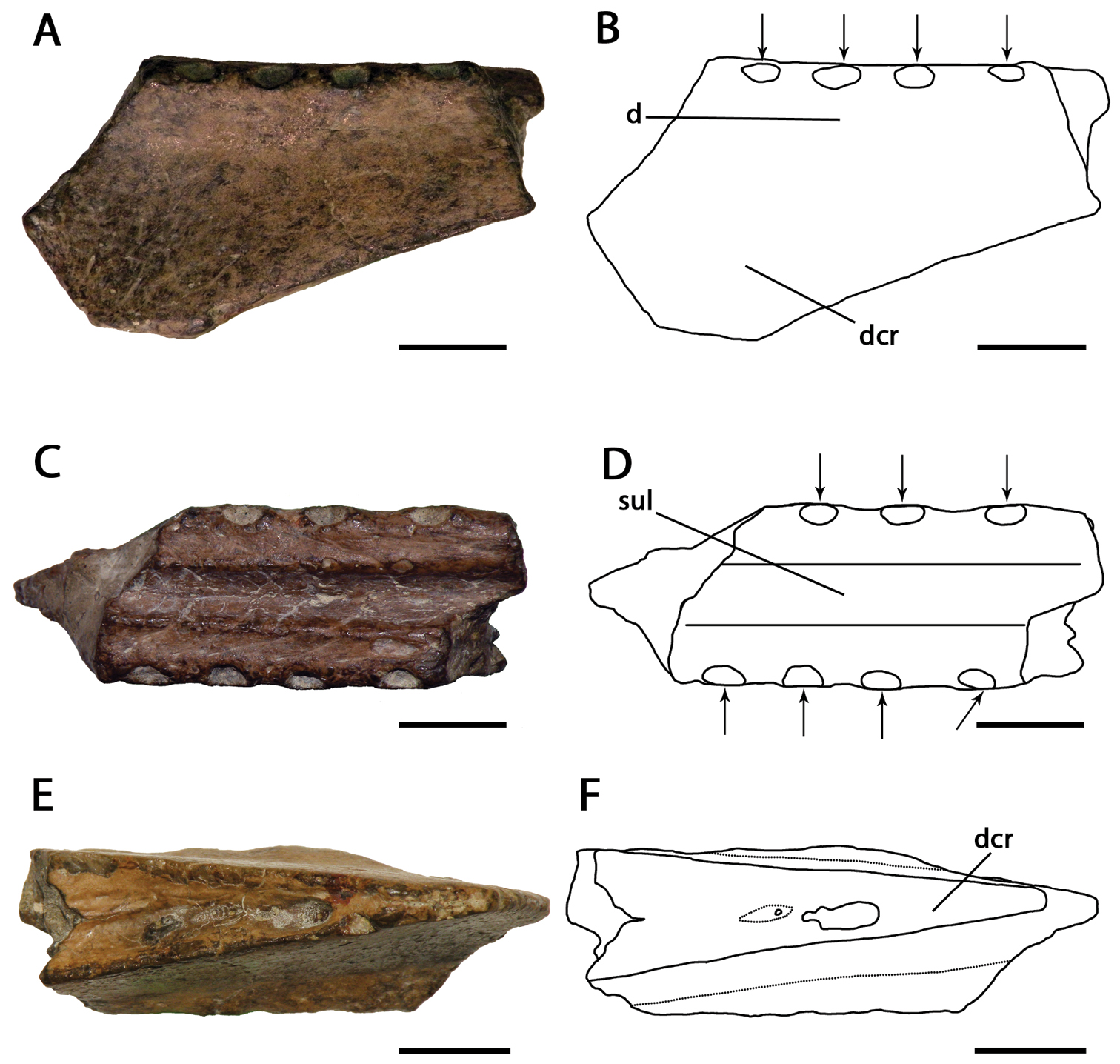
I. machaerorhynchus holotype

Ikrandraco avatar is notable for having a very long, low skull (the height of the back of the skull, at the quadrates, is less than 19% the length of the skull), with a prominent blade-like crest on the underside of the lower jaw and no corresponding crest on the tip of the upper jaw, a crest combination not seen in other pterosaurs to date. The posterior edge of the crest also has a hook-like process. Each side of the upper jaw has at least 21 small cylindrical teeth, and each side of the lower jaw has at least 19. The skull of the type specimen is 286.5 millimeters (11.28 in) long, and the skull of the second specimen is at least 268.3 millimeters (10.56 in) long.

Rodrigues & Kellner established four autapomorphies of Ikrandraco machaerorhynchus (then Lonchodraco). A deep crest is present at the underside of the lower jaws. To the rear, the profile of this crest turns upwards. Behind this crest a depression is present at the underside of the jaws. The midline groove at the top of the lower jaws symphysis is deep. Furthermore, there is a density of 4.5 teeth per three centimeters of jaw edge.

== Classification ==
Wang et al. performed a phylogenetic analysis including Ikrandraco and found it to be a basal pteranodontoid, more derived than Pteranodon but not as derived as the istiodactylids, anhanguerids, and other pteranodontoids. The portion of their results dealing with Pteranodontoidea is shown below.

- Pteranodontoidea
  - Pteranodon
  - - Cimoliopterus
    - Ikrandraco
    - - Istiodactylus
      - Nurhachius
    - - - "Cearadactylus" ligabuei
        - Guidraco
        - Ludodactylus
      - - Caulkicephalus
        - Cearadactylus
        - Liaoningopterus
        - Tropeognathus
        - - Anhanguera spielbergi
          - - Anhanguera piscator
            - Anhanguera santanae

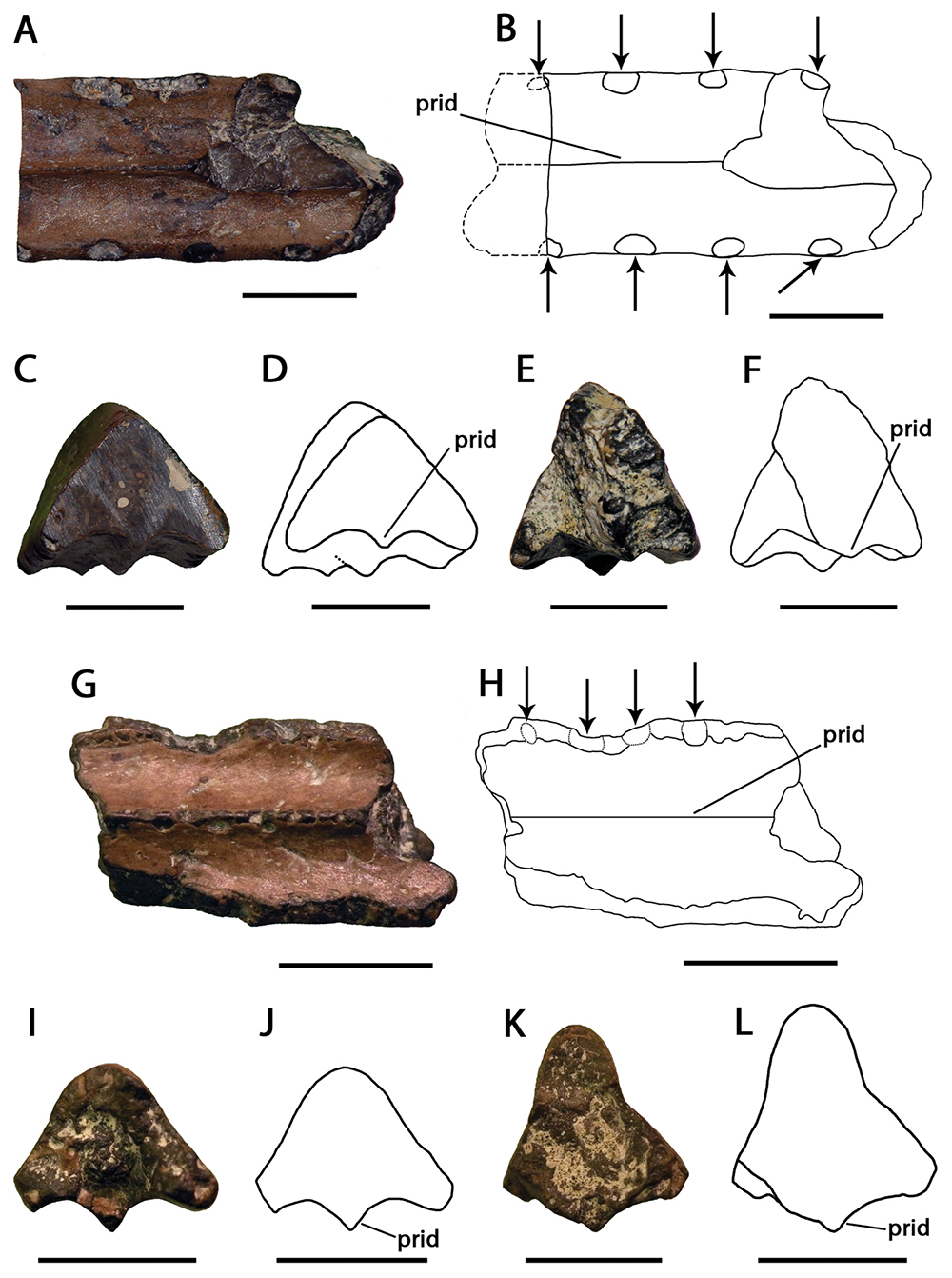
Lonchodraco(?) microdon holotype and holotype of Ornithocheirus oweni, both now assigned to I. machaerorhynchus

The cladogram below is a topology recovered by Pêgas et al. (2019). In the analyses, they recovered Ikrandraco as a member of the family Lonchodraconidae, and the sister taxon of Lonchodraco.

- Lanceodontia
  - - Lonchodraconidae
      - Lonchodraco
      - Ikrandraco
    - Istiodactyliformes
      - - Haopterus
      - - Hongshanopterus
        - Istiodactylidae
          - Nurhachius
          - Istiodactylinae
            - Istiodactylus
            - Liaoxipterus
  - - Boreopteridae
      - Boreopterus
      - Zhenyuanopterus
    - Ornithocheirae
      - Ornithocheirus
      - - Targaryendraconia
          - Targaryendraconidae
          - Cimoliopteridae
        - Anhangueria
          - Hamipteridae
          - Anhangueridae

== Paleobiology ==
Wang et al. interpreted the crest as a possible adaptation for skim fishing, although they did not regard this as the animal's main method of foraging. The hook on the crest may have been an attachment point for a throat pouch for storing food, akin to a pelican. Ikrandraco was an approximate contemporary of the distantly related anhanguerians Liaoningopterus gui and Guidraco venator, and all three are regarded as piscivores, but Ikrandraco differed from them in its much smaller and less robust teeth, indicating it had a different niche.

== See also ==
- List of pterosaur genera
- Timeline of pterosaur research
