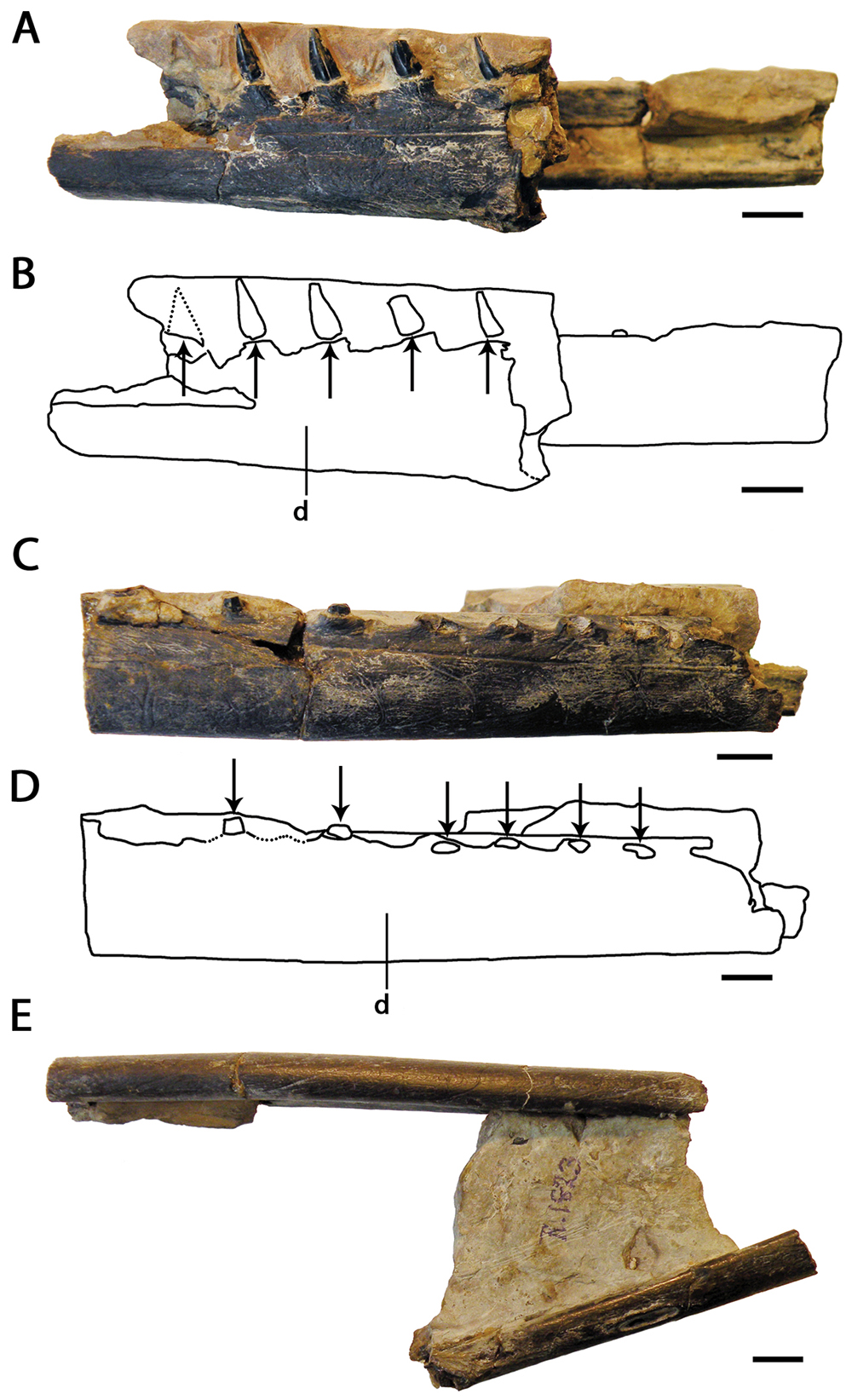
- Holotype jaw fragment in multiple views

Scientific classification
- Kingdom: Animalia
- Phylum: Chordata
- Class: Reptilia
- Order: †Pterosauria
- Suborder: †Pterodactyloidea
- Clade: †Pteranodontoidea
- Clade: †Ornithocheiromorpha
- Genus: †Serradraco; Rigal et al., 2018

Type species
- †Pterodactylus sagittirostris Owen, 1874

Species
- †S. sagittirostris (Owen, 1874)

Synonyms
- Pterodactylus sagittirostris Owen, 1874; Ornithocheirus sagittirostris (Owen, 1874); Lonchodectes sagittirostris (Owen, 1874)

= Serradraco =

Serradraco Temporal range: Early Cretaceous, Valanginian

Genus of pteranodontoid pterosaur from the Early Cretaceous

Serradraco is a genus of Early Cretaceous pterodactyloid pterosaur from the Valanginian aged Tunbridge Wells Sand Formation in England. Named by Rigal et al. in 2018 with the description of a second specimen, it contains a single species, S. sagittirostris, which was formerly considered a species of Lonchodectes, L. sagittirostris. Although it has been interpreted as a probable lonchodectid, a subsequent study suggested it did not belong in Lonchodectidae.

== Discovery and naming ==
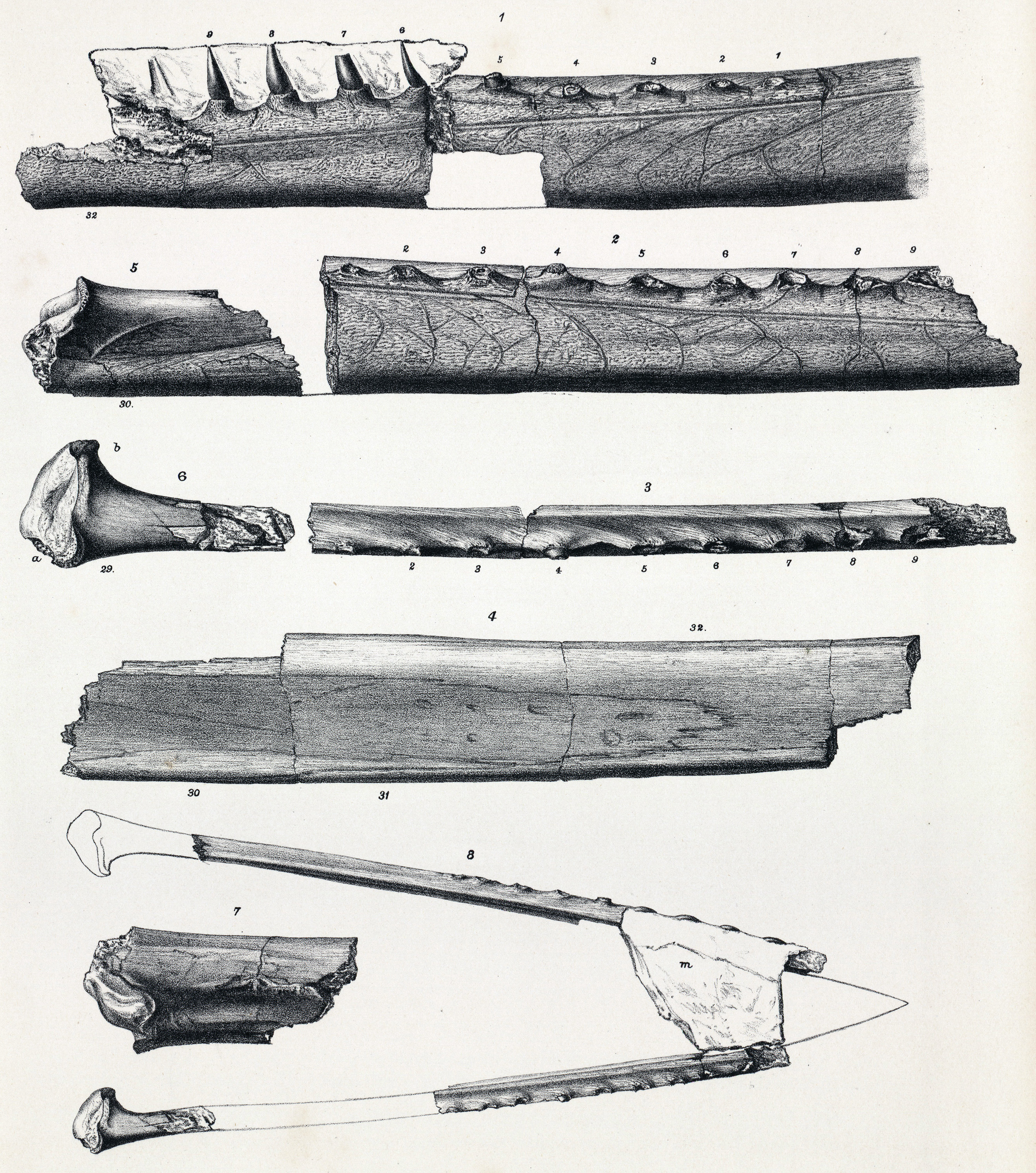
Lithograph of the holotype

In 1874, Richard Owen named a pair of lower jaws from the collection of Samuel Husband Beckles, found at St Leonards-on-Sea in Sussex, as a new species of Pterodactylus: Pterodactylus sagittirostris. The specific name means "arrowhead-snouted" in Latin, referring to the mandible profile in upper view. In 1888, Edwin Tulley Newton, conforming to the soon to be published pterosaur systematics by Richard Lydekker, renamed the species into Ornithocheirus sagittirostris. In July 1891, the British Museum (Natural History), the present Natural History Museum, bought the piece from the heirs of Beckles.

In 1914, Reginald Walter Hooley renamed the species into Lonchodectes sagittirostris. In 1919 however, Gustav von Arthaber again considered it an Ornithocheirus sagittirostris, which was confirmed by Peter Wellnhofer in 1978. In 2001, David Unwin returned to the Lonchodectes sagittirostris designation. In 2013, Taissa Rodrigues and Alexander Wilhelm Armin Kellner concluded that Lonchodectes sagittirostris lacked any distinguishing traits and was therefore a nomen dubium.

In 2017, Stanislas Rigal, David Martill and Steven Sweetman disagreed with this and named a separate genus Serradraco, resulting in the new combination Serradraco sagittirostris. The type species of the genus is the original Pterodactylus sagittirostris. The generic name is a combination of the Latin serra, "saw" and draco, "dragon", referring to the saw-like upper profile of the lower jaws. They also reported a second specimen, BEXHM 2015.18, consisting of a small fragment of jaw with three teeth; six complete caudal vertebrae fused together and two fragmentary caudal vertebrae in articulation; a distal left ulna; a right proximal syncarpal; portions of a minimum of three phalanges and two indeterminate elements. This second specimen was originally referred to cf. Lonchodraco, but a later paper pointed out that it displays no significant differences from the holotype.

== Paleobiology ==
Patterns on the microwear of Serradraco's teeth resemble those of modern piscovorous reptiles, indicating that Serradraco preyed upon fish.
