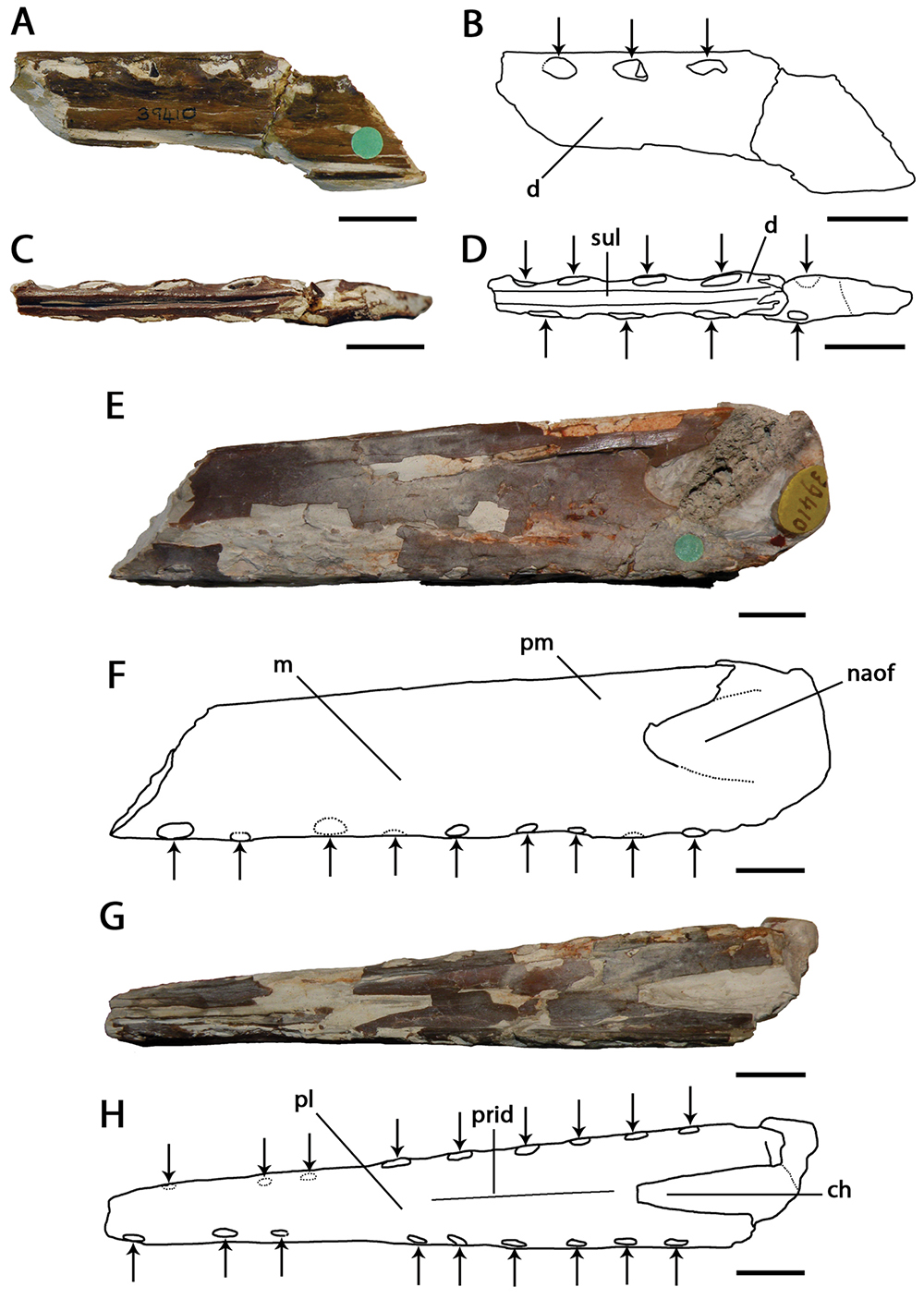
- Lectotype jaw fragment (A–D) and assigned rostrum fragment (E–H)

Scientific classification
- Kingdom: Animalia
- Phylum: Chordata
- Class: Reptilia
- Order: †Pterosauria
- Suborder: †Pterodactyloidea
- Clade: †Pteranodontoidea
- Clade: †Ornithocheiromorpha
- Family: †Lonchodectidae; Hooley, 1914
- Genus: †Lonchodectes; Hooley, 1914

Type species
- †Pterodactylus compressirostris Owen, 1851

Species
- †L. compressirostris (Owen, 1851)

Synonyms
- Genus synonymy: Cimoliopterus? Rodrigues & Kellner, 2013; Species synonymy: Pterodactylus compressirostris Owen, 1851; Ornithocheirus compressirostris (Owen, 1851) Seeley, 1870; Pterodactylus cuvieri? Bowerbank, 1851; Ornithocheirus cuvieri? (Bowerbank, 1851) Seeley, 1870; Coloborhynchus cuvieri? (Bowerbank, 1851) Owen, 1874; Anhanguera cuvieri? (Bowerbank, 1851) Bakhurina & Unwin, 1995; Cimoliopterus cuvieri? (Bowerbank, 1851) Rodrigues & Kellner, 2013; Ornithocheirus brachyrhinus? Seeley, 1870; Pterodactylus fittoni? Owen, 1859; Ornithocheirus fittoni? (Owen, 1859) Seeley, 1870; Anhanguera fittoni? (Owen, 1859) Unwin, 2001

= Lonchodectes =

Lonchodectes Temporal range: Late Cretaceous, 94 Ma

Genus of lonchodectid pterosaur from the Late Cretaceous

Lonchodectes (meaning "lance biter") is a genus of lonchodectid pterosaur from several formations dating to the Turonian (Late Cretaceous) of England, mostly in the area around Kent. The species belonging to it had been assigned to Ornithocheirus until David Unwin's work of the 1990s and 2000s. Several potential species are known; most are based on scrappy remains, and have gone through several other generic assignments. The genus is part of the complex taxonomy issues surrounding Early Cretaceous pterosaurs from Brazil and England, such as Amblydectes, Anhanguera, Coloborhynchus, and Ornithocheirus.

== History and species ==
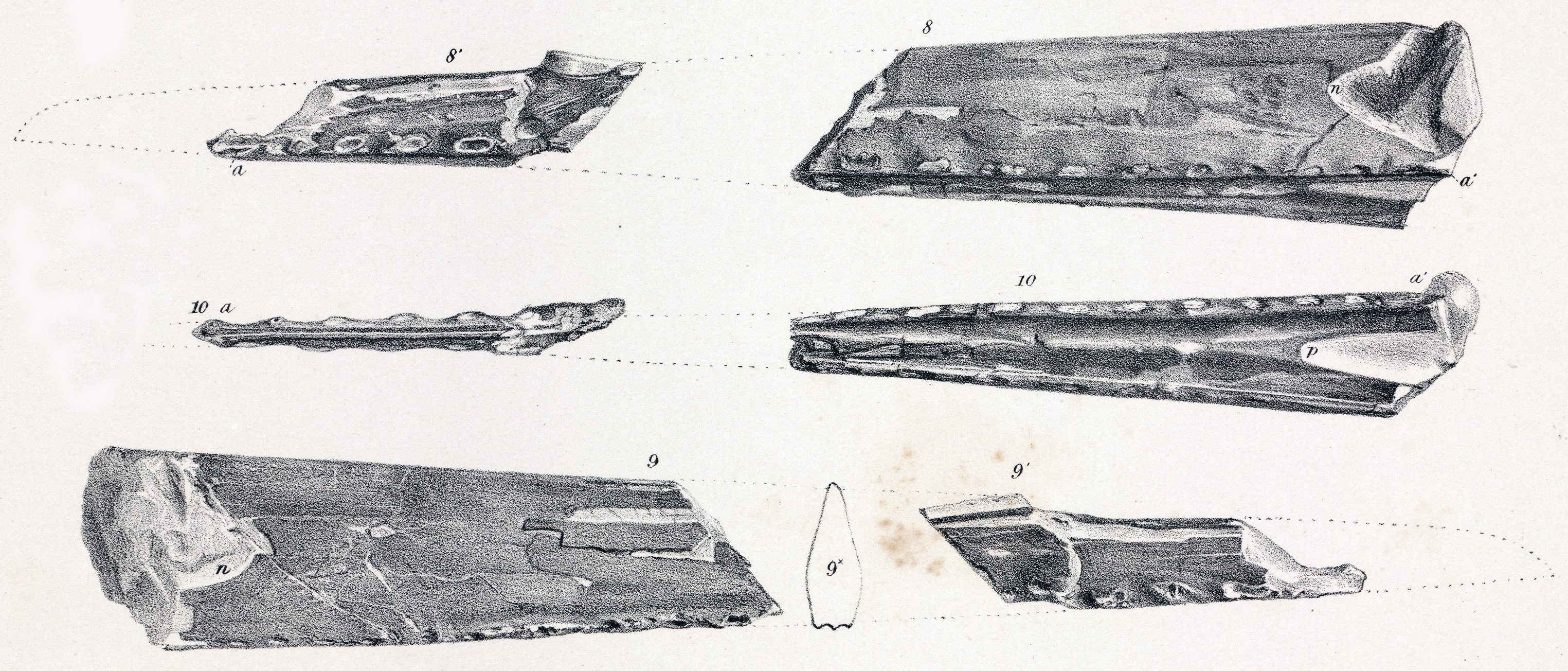
19th century lithograph of the lectotype and assigned specimen

Numerous species have been referred to this genus over time, and only those more widely connected with the genus are included here.

The type species, L. compressirostris, is based on NHMUK 39410, a partial upper jaw from the Turonian-age Upper Cretaceous Upper Chalk near Kent. Richard Owen named in 1851 as a species of Pterodactylus; it was transferred to Ornithocheirus in 1870 by Harry Govier Seeley, before becoming the type species of Lonchodectes in Reginald Walter Hooley's 1914 review of Ornithocheirus. Confusingly, this species was also long regarded, incorrectly, as the type species of Ornithocheirus.

A variety of postcranial remains resembling those of azhdarchoids from the Cambridge Greensand have been referred to Lonchodectes; however, much of this material has since been referred to Ornithostoma.

In 2019, the Brazilian palaeontologist Rubi V. Pêgas and colleagues suggested that the type specimen of Lonchodectes compressirostris could represent the same species as Cimoliopterus cuvieri. They cautioned this is impossible to confirm until associated skull and mandible material is found.

=== Formerly assigned species ===
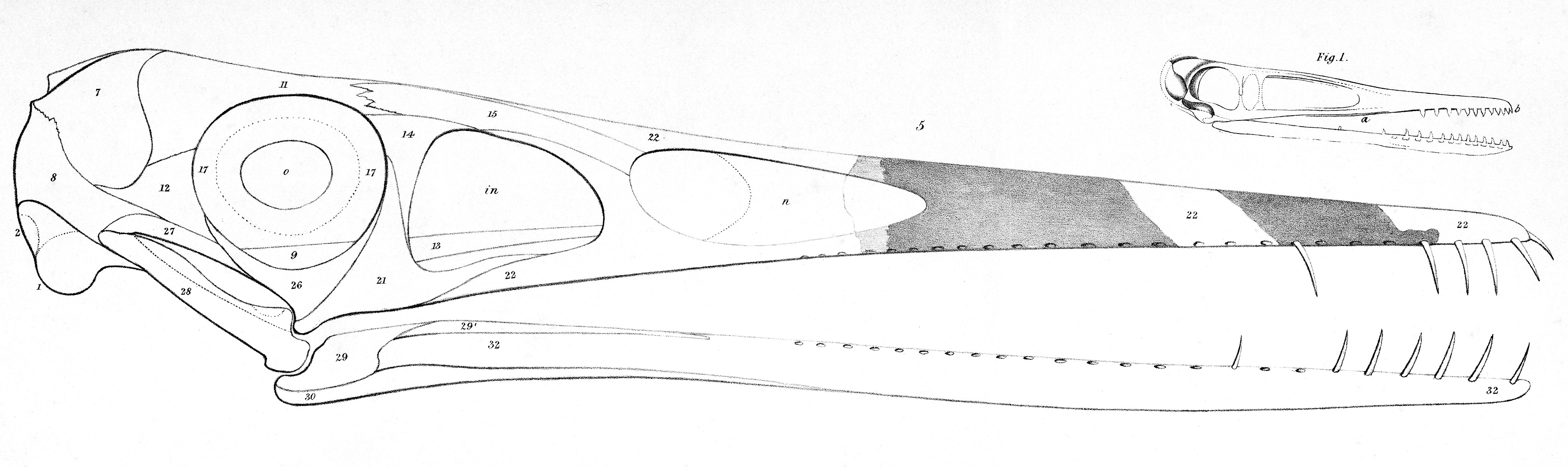
L. compressirostris fossils in place with Pterodactylus as template

Hooley added two other species at this time, both of which had also been originally referred to Pterodactylus, then to Ornithocheirus: L. giganteus, a Cenomanian-age jaw fragment from the Chalk of Kent; and L. daviesii, another jaw fragment, from the Albian-age Gault Clay.

"Pterodactylus" sagittirostris, based on NHMUK R.1823, a lower jaw fragment from the ?Valanginian-Hauterivian-age Lower Cretaceous Hastings Beds of East Sussex, "Ornithocheirus" platystomus, "Ornithocheirus" machaerorhynchus, and "O." microdon were assigned to Lonchodectes in a 2001 review by David Unwin of Cambridge Greensand pterosaurs. joining L. compressirostris, L. giganteus, L. platystomus, and L. sagittirostris in his listing of valid species. However, L. giganteus, L. machaerorhynchus, and L. microdon have since been assigned to a new genus, Lonchodraco, while L. sagittirostris has been renamed Serradraco. L. platystomus may be a species of Amblydectes. In 2020, a review of Lonchodectidae was conducted by paleontologist Alexander Averianov, where he reassigned the species L. machaerorhynchus to the genus Ikrandraco due to similarities in rostral morphology, as I. machaerorhynchus, and he also considered L. microdon a junior synonym of machaerorhynchus. Therefore, Lonchodectes is limited to its type species, L. compressirostris.

== Classification ==
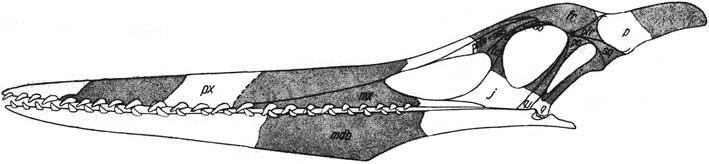
1919 Reconstruction of the skull by von Arthaber

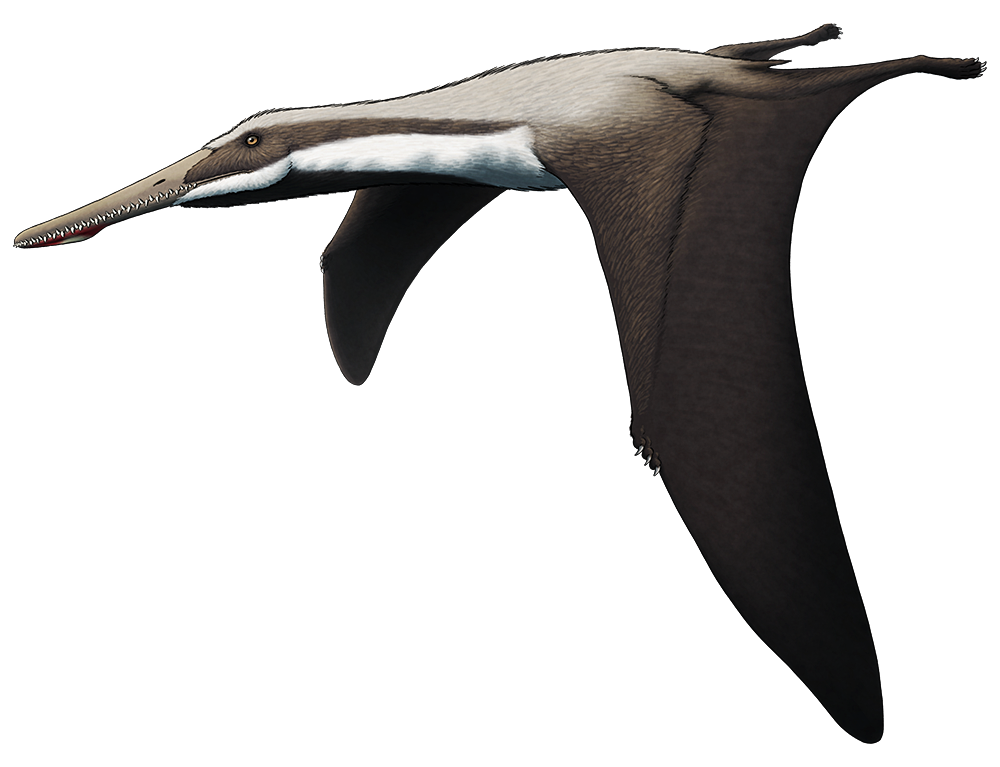
Hypothetical life restoration

In Peter Wellnhofer's 1991 The Illustrated Encyclopedia of Pterosaurs, written before Unwin's work, the species were included within Ornithocheirus (because of L. compressirostris being thought to be the type species), and are in fact the main fossils illustrated to represent the genus. In 2003, Unwin placed them in their own family, Lonchodectidae, which he grouped within the group Ctenochasmatoidea, while in 2006, he placed the family Lonchodectidae within the Azhdarchoidea, the group that includes the tapejarids and azhdarchids.

The cladogram below is a topology recovered by Longrich and colleagues in 2018. In their analysis, they placed Lonchodectes within the family Lonchodectidae as the sister taxon of Lonchodraco. Contrary to previous analyses, Longrich and colleagues placed Lonchodectidae (including Lonchodectes) within the more inclusive group Ornithocheiromorpha.

- Ornithocheiromorpha
  - Hongshanopterus
  - - - Lonchodectidae
        - Lonchodraco
        - Lonchodectes
      - Boreopteridae
        - Boreopterus
        - Zhenyuanopterus
    - Lanceodontia
      - Istiodactylidae
        - Nurhachius
        - - Liaoxipterus
          - Istiodactylus
      - - - Aetodactylus
          - Cimoliopterus
        - Anhangueria

== Paleobiology ==
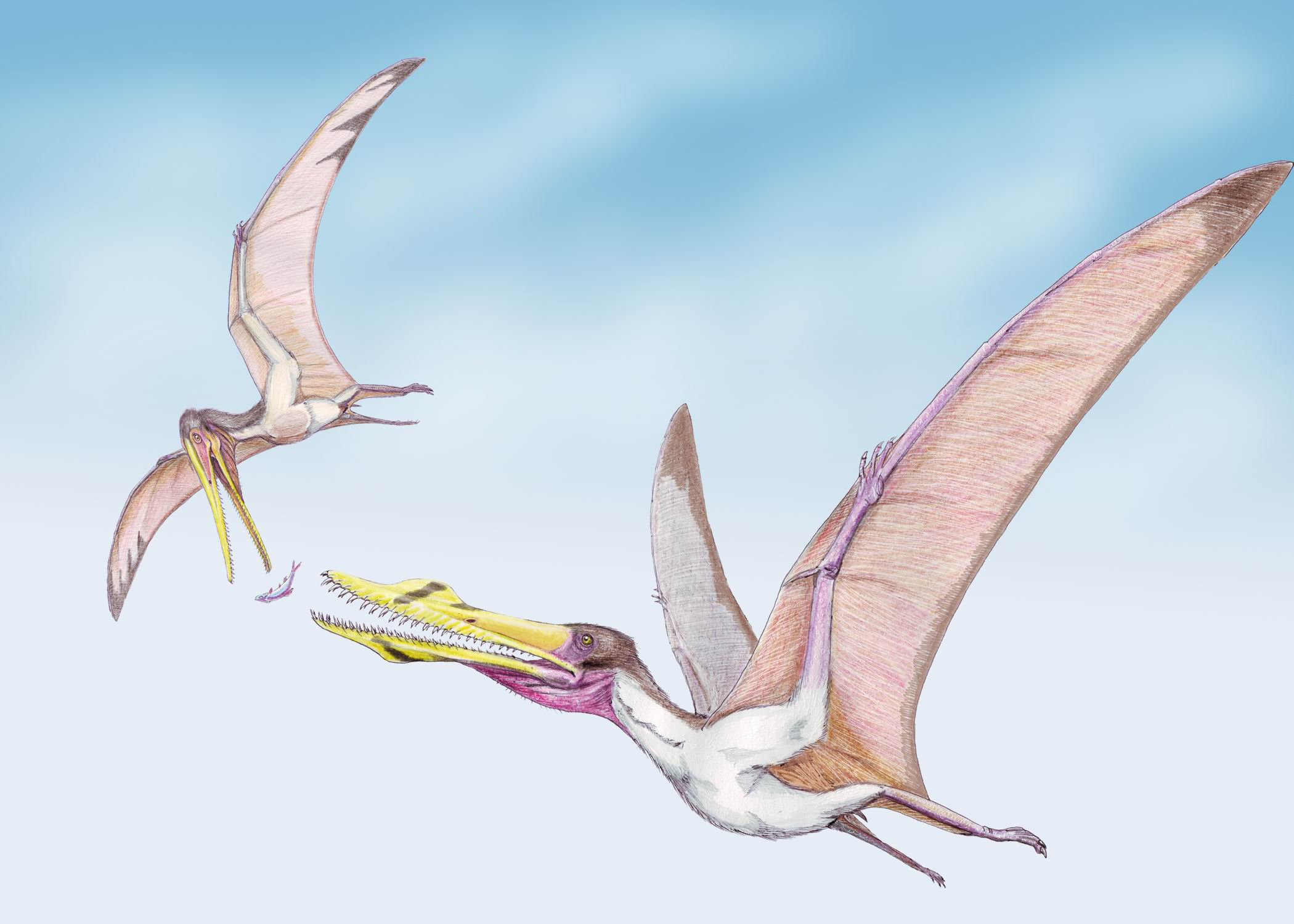
Lonchodectes (left) attacked by the larger Cimoliopterus (right)

Lonchodectes had long jaws with many short teeth, and the jaws were compressed vertically, like "a pair of sugar tongs with teeth". Related species (including several taxa formerly included within the genus) had crests on their lower jaws, so the same probably also applied to L. compressirostris.

== See also ==
- List of pterosaur genera
- Timeline of pterosaur research
