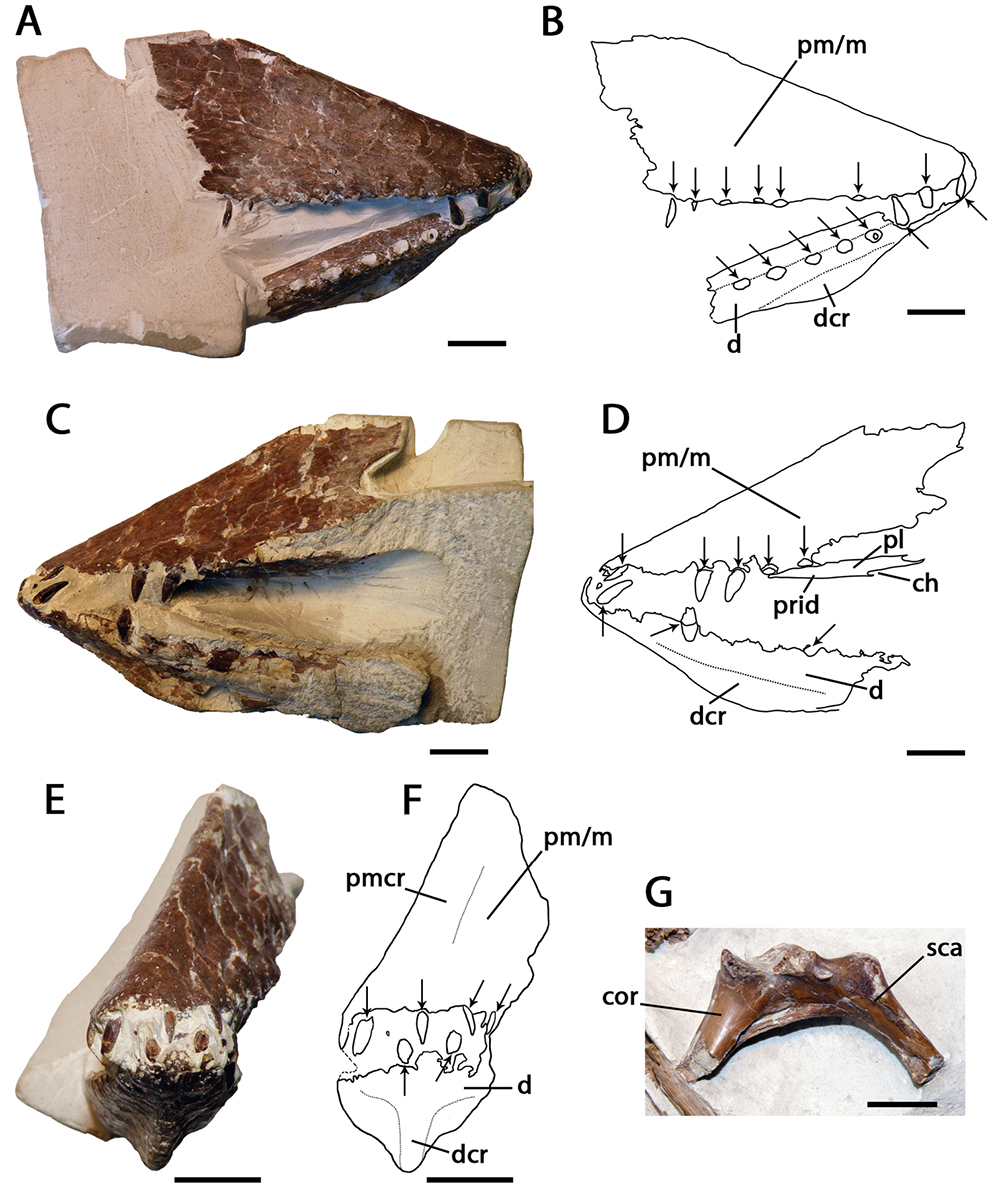
- Lectotype of L. giganteus

Scientific classification
- Kingdom: Animalia
- Phylum: Chordata
- Class: Reptilia
- Order: †Pterosauria
- Suborder: †Pterodactyloidea
- Family: †Lonchodraconidae
- Genus: †Lonchodraco; Rodrigues & Kellner, 2013

Type species
- †Pterodactylus giganteus Bowerbank, 1846

Species
- †L. giganteus (Bowerbank, 1846)

Synonyms
- Pterodactylus giganteus Bowerbank, 1846; Lonchodectes giganteus (Bowerbank, 1846); Pterodactylus conirostris Owen, 1850

= Lonchodraco =

Lonchodraco Temporal range: Albian-Turonian ~112–90 Ma

Genus of pterosaur from the Cretaceous period

Lonchodraco is a genus of lonchodraconid pterodactyloid pterosaur from the Early and Late Cretaceous of southern England. The genus includes species that were previously assigned to other genera.

== Discovery and naming ==
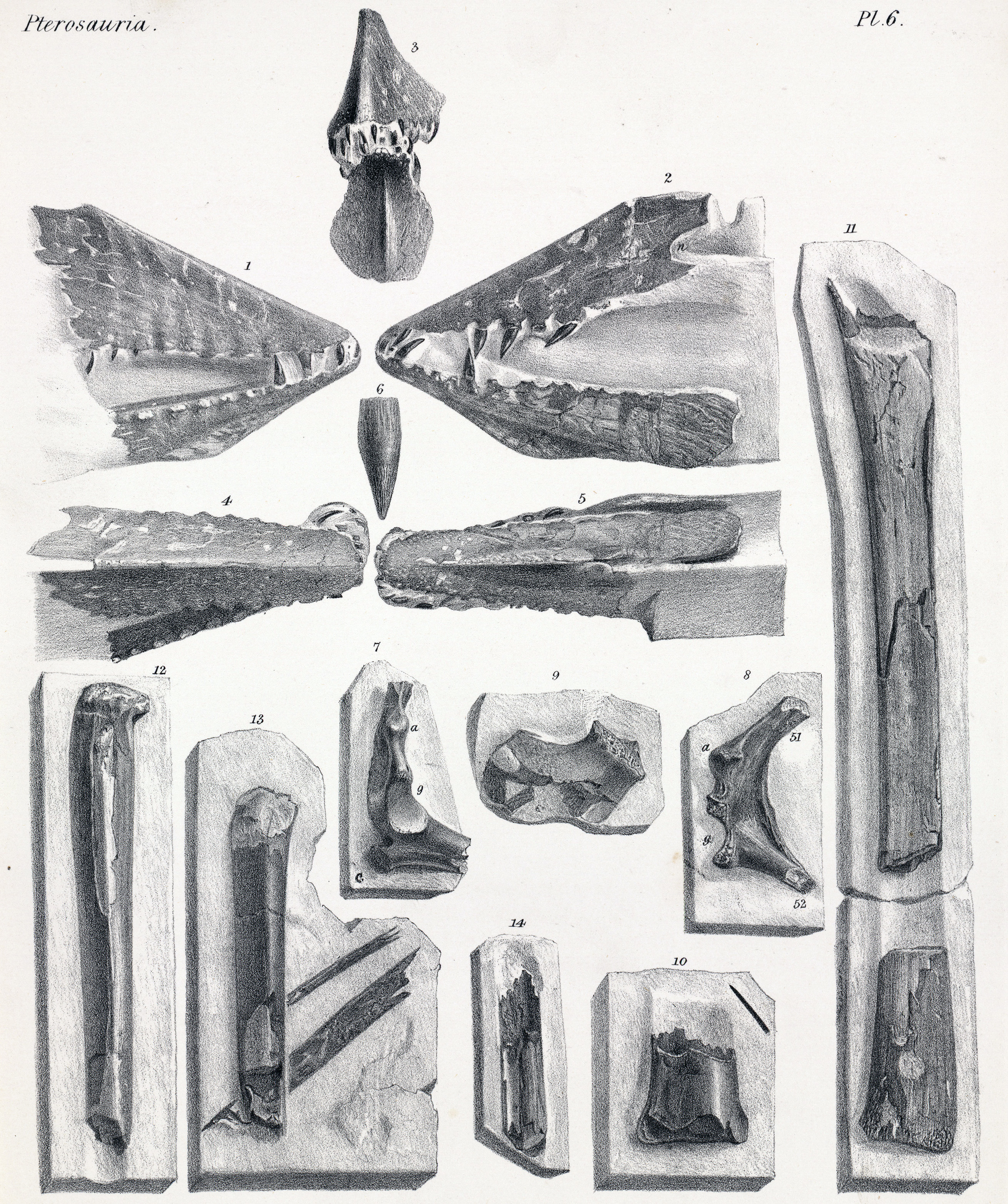
Lithograph of the L. giganteus lectotype rostrum, with associated and referred bones

In 1846, James Scott Bowerbank named and described some remains found in a chalk pit at Burham near Maidstone in Kent, as a new species of Pterodactylus: Pterodactylus giganteus. The specific name means "the gigantic one" in Latin. The same pit generated remains of Pterodactylus cuvieri. In 1848, Bowerbank published a histological study of the bone structure of P. giganteus.

At the time, the British Association Code of 1843 allowed to change names if they were inappropriate. In 1850, Richard Owen, considering the species not to have been particularly large, and renamed it into Pterodactylus conirostris; the specific name meaning "cone-snouted", which was based on the conical snout of specimen NHMUK PV 39412. However, after insistent objections by Bowerbank, Owen retracted this name in 1851 when he described the finds in more detail.

In 1914 Reginald Walter Hooley assigned the species to a new genus Lonchodectes, "the lance biter", as a Lonchodectes giganteus. In 2013, Taissa Rodrigues and Alexander Wilhelm Armin Kellner concluded that the type species of Lonchodectes, Lonchodectes compressirostris, was a nomen dubium. Therefore, they created a new genus Lonchodraco, combining Greek λόγχη, lonchē, "lance", with Latin draco, "dragon". Pterodactylus giganteus was made the type species of Lonchodraco, resulting in a Lonchodraco giganteus. Two other species previously assigned to Lonchodectes were moved to the new genus, resulting in a Lonchodraco machaerorhynchus and a Lonchodraco(?) microdon. The question mark in the latter name indicates that the authors were uncertain about the correctness of the assignment.

Rodrigues and Kellner considered NHMUK PV 39412 to be the lectotype of Lonchodraco giganteus, after a choice by Peter Wellnhofer in 1978. It was found in a layer of the Chalk Formation, dating from the Cenomanian-Turonian. It consists of the front of a snout, the front of a pair of lower jaws, a piece of a scapulocoracoid, the upper parts of a humerus and an ulna, and a part of a wing finger phalanx.

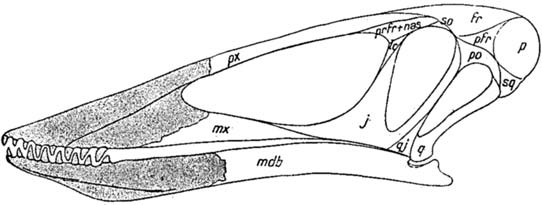
1919 reconstruction of L. giganteus by von Arthaber

Also in 1869, Seeley informally named "Ptenodactylus microdon". In 1870, he formally named it Ornithocheirus microdon, "small tooth", Hooley (1914) transferred this species to Lonchodectes to form the new combination Lonchodectes microdon. Its holotype, CAMSM B54486, has its provenance in the Cambridge Greensand and consists of the front of a snout. The type specimen of Ornithocheirus oweni Seeley 1870, CAMSM B 54439, was synonymized with microdon by Unwin (2001), and Rodrigues & Kellner (2013) agreed with this synonymy.

In 1869, Harry Govier Seeley named Ptenodactylus machaerorhynchus, at the same time disclaiming the name which makes it invalid by modern standards. In 1870, Seeley had realised that the generic name Ptenodactylus had been preoccupied and renamed the species into Ornithocheirus machaerorhynchus. The specific name means "sabre snout" in Greek. In 1914 Hooley renamed it into Lonchodectes machae[r]orhynchus. Its holotype, CAMSM B54855, was found near Cambridge in a layer of the Cambridge Greensand dating from the Cenomanian but containing reworked fossils from the Albian. It consists of the rear end of a symphysis of the lower jaws. However, in his review of Lonchodectidae, Averianov (2020) assigned Lonchodraco machaerorhynchus to Ikrandraco due to similarities in rostral morphology, as I. machaerorhynchus, and he also declared Lonchodraco microdon (including P. oweni) a junior synonym of machaerorhynchus. Thus, Lonchodraco is limited to the type species L. giganteus.

== Description ==
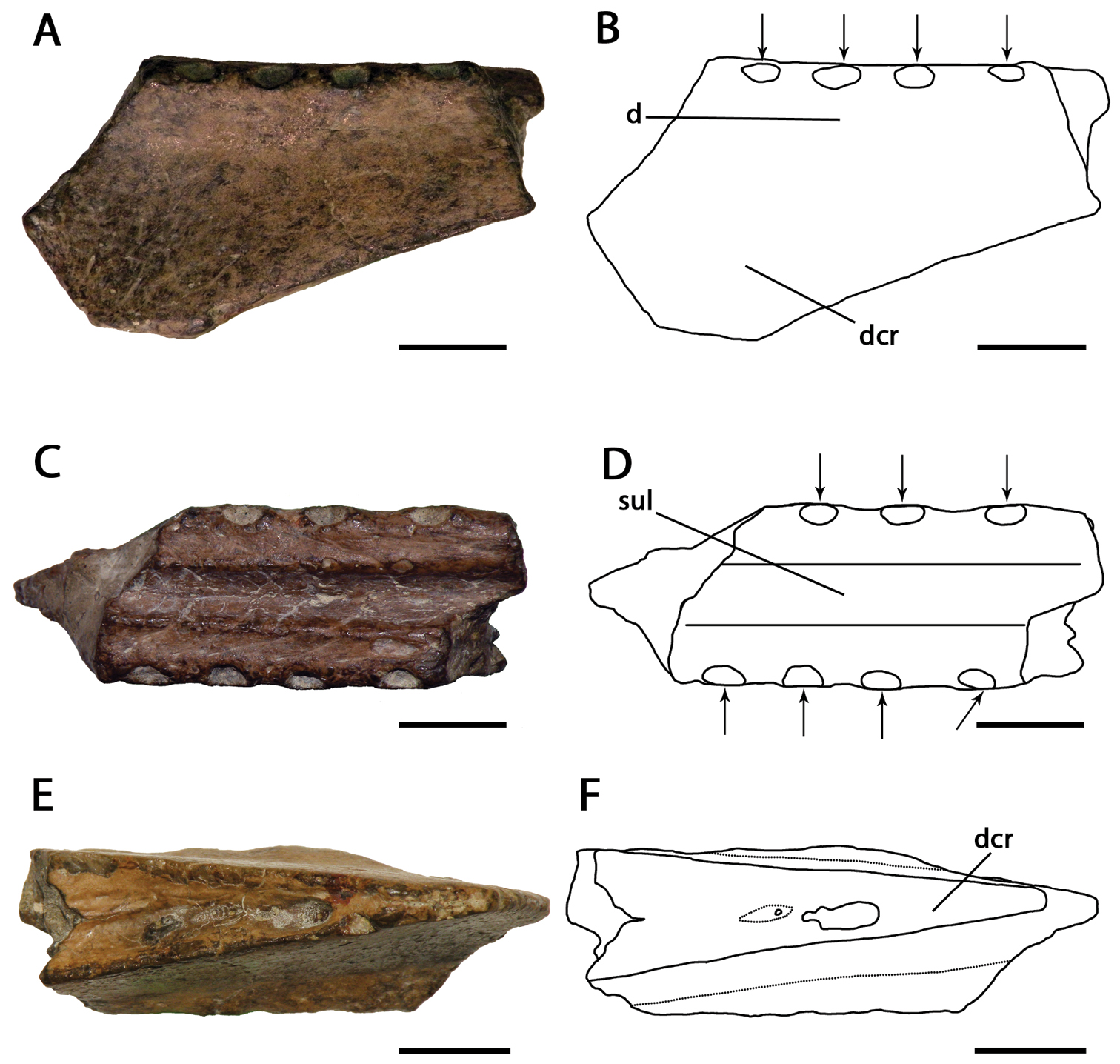
Holotype of the species L. machaerorhynchus, now assigned as Ikrandraco machaerorhynchus

Rodrigues & Kellner treated Lonchodraco as a clade, which thus could possess synapomorphies, shared derived traits, setting the clade apart from related groups. They established one of these: the tooth sockets are elevated relative to the palate and lower jaw edge. Also a unique combination of themselves not unique traits was present. The tooth sockets in the front of the jaws are small, with a diameter of no more than four millimetres. These sockets do not vary significantly in size. The distance between the tooth sockets about equals their diameter. The midline ridge on the palate is high. A crest is present below the lower jaws.

Bowerbank estimated P. giganteus had a wingspan of about eight to nine feet. Rodrigues & Kellner established two autapomorphies of Lonchodraco giganteus. Below the front of the lower jaws a short blade-like crest is present. There is a density of about six tooth sockets per three centimetres of jaw edge. There is a unique combination of traits: the snout bears a crest; the front part of the snout is rounded; the front part of the lower jaws is rounded; the margins of the front tooth sockets diverge.

== Classification ==
In 2013, Brazilian paleontologists Rodrigues & Kellner assigned Lonchodraco to a family called Lonchodraconidae, which was not defined as a clade and of which Lonchodraco was the only member. Later in their analysis however, Rodrigues & Kellner considered the definition of Lonchodraconidae to be more or less synonymous to that of Lonchodectidae, however, they stated that Lonchodectes is a nomen dubium and therefore should not be included in the group. In their cladistic analysis, they concluded that the three species of Lonchodraco formed a cluster, but it proved impossible to obtain a precise position for it because their inclusion in the dataset made the tree largely collapse into a polytomy containing, apart from the three species, all Pterodactyloidea and even the Rhamphorhynchidae.

A topology recovered by Longrich and colleagues in 2018 placed Lonchodraco within the family Lonchodectidae as the sister taxon of Lonchodectes, with the family being placed within the larger group Ornithocheiromorpha. However, in several recent studies, including Pêgas et al. (2019) and Holgado & Pêgas (2020), the term Lonchodraconidae is used, and Lonchodraco is recovered within this group, sister taxon to Ikrandraco.

Topology 1: Longrich et al. (2018).

- Ornithocheiromorpha
  - Hongshanopterus
  - - - Lonchodectidae
        - Lonchodraco
        - Lonchodectes
      - Boreopteridae
        - Boreopterus
        - Zhenyuanopterus
    - Lanceodontia
      - Istiodactylidae
        - Nurhachius
        - - Liaoxipterus
          - Istiodactylus
      - - - Aetodactylus
          - Cimoliopterus
        - Anhangueria
          - - Guidraco
            - Ludodactylus
          - - - Cearadactylus
              - Brasileodactylus
            - Ornithocheirae

Topology 2: Pêgas et al. (2019).

- Lanceodontia
  - - Lonchodraconidae
      - Lonchodraco
      - Ikrandraco
    - Istiodactyliformes
      - - Haopterus
      - - Hongshanopterus
        - Istiodactylidae
          - Nurhachius
          - Istiodactylinae
            - Istiodactylus
            - Liaoxipterus
  - - Boreopteridae
      - Boreopterus
      - Zhenyuanopterus
    - Ornithocheirae
      - Ornithocheirus
      - - Targaryendraconia
          - Targaryendraconidae
          - Cimoliopteridae
        - Anhangueria
          - Hamipteridae
          - Anhangueridae

== See also ==
- List of pterosaur genera
- Timeline of pterosaur research
