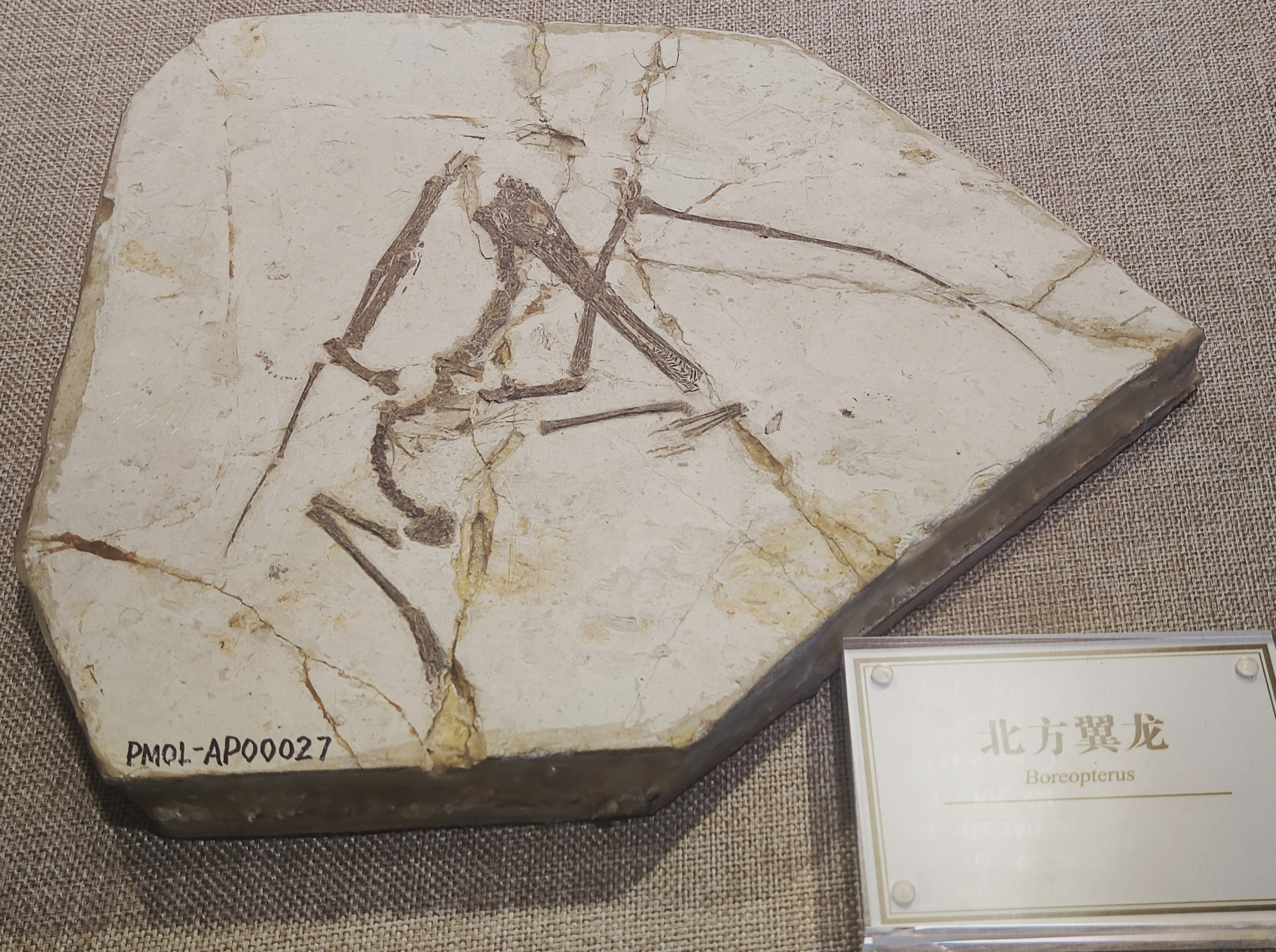
- Fossil, Liaoning Palaeontological Museum

Scientific classification
- Kingdom: Animalia
- Phylum: Chordata
- Class: Reptilia
- Order: †Pterosauria
- Suborder: †Pterodactyloidea
- Family: †Boreopteridae
- Subfamily: †Boreopterinae
- Genus: †Boreopterus; Lü & Ji, 2005

Type species
- †Boreopterus cuiae Lü & Ji, 2005

Other species
- †B. giganticus Jiang et al., 2014

Synonyms
- Zhenyuanopterus? Lü, 2010

= Boreopterus =

Boreopterus Temporal range: Early Cretaceous, 124.6 Ma

Genus of boreopterid pterosaur from the Early Cretaceous

Boreopterus is a genus of boreopterid pterodactyloid pterosaur from the Barremian-Aptian-age Lower Cretaceous Yixian Formation of Dalian, Liaoning, China.

== Etymology ==
Boreopterus was named in 2005 by Lü Junchang and Ji Qiang. The type species is Boreopterus cuiae. The genus name is derived from Greek boreios, "northern" and pteron, "wing". The specific epithet honors Cui Xu.

== Description ==
Boreopterus is based on holotype JZMP-04-07-3, a nearly complete but crushed skeleton and skull. The skull is 235 millimeters long (9.25 inches), low and elongated with a rounded tip. Its wingspan is estimated to have been around 1.45 meters (4.76 feet). Its teeth, especially the anterior nine pairs, are quite large, forming a mesh of sharp teeth at the front of the mouth; the third and fourth teeth from the front are the largest. There are at least 27 teeth in each side of both the upper and lower jaws, which is a large amount.

== Classification ==
Lü and Ji initially placed Boreopterus in the family Ornithocheiridae when they described it in 2006, a classification which was supported later that year by David Unwin. However, Lü in 2006 published a cladistic analysis showing Boreopterus to be the sister taxon of Feilongus (together forming the new family Boreopteridae) in a more basal position than Haopterus.

In 2013, a more comprehensive study of pterosaur relationships supported the close relationship of Boreopterus and Feilongus, as well as their relatively basal status among pterodactyloids. Later that year, Andres & Myers found the boreopterids as the sister group of Cycnorhamphus within the archaeopterodactyloid group Gallodactylidae. However, subsequent analysis have found boreopterids to be indeed members of the Ornithocheiroidea, composed of Boreopterus, Zhenyuanopterus and Guidraco, while Feilongus is a relative of Gnathosaurus. In 2018, Nicholas Longrich and colleagues found the family Boreopteridae to only contain Boreopterus and Zhenyuanopterus, while Guidraco was placed in a more derived position within the clade Anhangueria. They also found the family Lonchodectidae as the sister taxon of Boreopteridae.

Topology 1: Andres et al. (2014).

- Anhangueria
  - Boreopteridae
    - Guidraco
    - Boreopterinae
      - Boreopterus
      - Zhenyuanopterus
  - - Cearadactylus
    - - Brasileodactylus
      - - Ludodactylus
        - Ornithocheirae
          - Anhangueridae
            - Liaoningopterus
            - Anhanguera
          - Ornithocheiridae
            - Tropeognathus
            - Ornithocheirinae
              - Coloborhynchus
              - Ornithocheirus

Topology 2: Longrich et al. (2018).

- Ornithocheiromorpha
  - Hongshanopterus
  - - - Lonchodectidae
        - Lonchodraco
        - Lonchodectes
      - Boreopteridae
        - Boreopterus
        - Zhenyuanopterus
    - Lanceodontia
      - - Istiodactylidae
      - - - Aetodactylus
          - Cimoliopterus
        - Anhangueria
          - - Guidraco
            - Ludodactylus
          - - - Cearadactylus
              - Brasileodactylus
            - Ornithocheirae

== Paleobiology ==
Pterosaurs like Boreopterus are interpreted by Unwin as soaring animals, like today's albatrosses and frigatebirds. However, it has also been suggested that boreopterids foraged while swimming, trapping small prey with their needle-like teeth, a method similar to that of modern Platanista dolphins.

It has been suggested that the closely related Zhenyuanopterus was merely the adult form of this animal.

== See also ==
- Timeline of pterosaur research
