= Reginald Hooley =

Reginald W. Hooley
- Born: September 5, 1865; Southampton
- Died: May 5, 1923 (aged 57)
- Occupation: Merchant
- Known for: Paleontology on the Isle of Wight
- Spouse: E.E. Holden (m.1912)
- Father: William Hooley

Reginald Walter Hooley (5 September 1865 – 5 May 1923) was a businessman and amateur paleontologist, collecting on the Isle of Wight. He is probably best remembered for describing the dinosaur Iguanodon atherfieldensis, now Mantellisaurus.

== Biography ==
Reginald Hooley was born on 5 September 1865 in Southampton, the son of William Hooley, a wealthy gentleman. In 1889 R.W. Hooley began to work for Godrich & Petman, wine merchants, and later in life became managing director of that firm. Living in Portswood, in 1912 he married E.E. Holden and moved to Winchester. In 1913 he was elected a member of the Winchester city council. Hooley was a member of the Hampshire Field Club & Archaeological Society at Winchester from 1890. He was one of the founders of the Isle of Wight Natural History and Archaeological Society. He was an honorary curator of the Winchester Museum between 1918 and 1923.

== Isle of Wight ==
Hooley made regular visits to the Isle of Wight and found hundreds of fossils. Hooley made his most famous finds in 1889 and 1914 when two iguanodontid skeletons were exposed by erosion at the cliffs. In 1904 the remains of "Ornithodesmus" were uncovered by a cliff fall. Several fossil specimens were included in fourteen published scientific papers, starting in 1900. He described remains of many turtles, and named the dinosaur Iguanodon atherfieldensis and the pterosaur Ornithodesmus latidens.

== Legacy ==
After Hooley's death, the paper naming Iguanodon atherfieldensis was posthumously published and most of the Hooley Collection, over 1330 specimens, was acquired in 1924 by the British Museum of Natural History which displays the iguanodontid skeletons in the Dinosaur Hall. In 1926 the extinct plant Hooleya was named after him.
