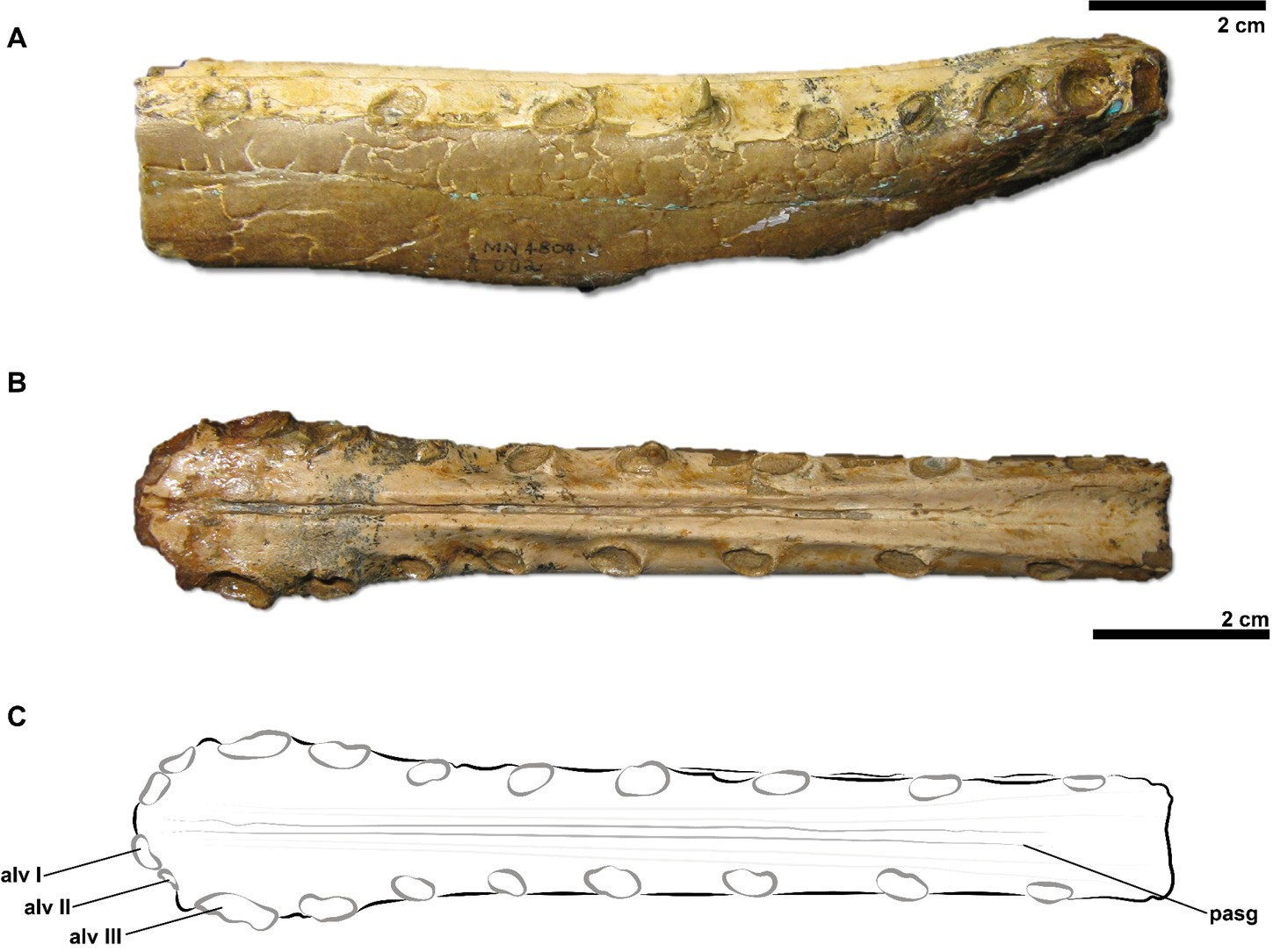
- Holotype lower jaw (MN 4804-V)

Scientific classification
- Kingdom: Animalia
- Phylum: Chordata
- Class: Reptilia
- Order: †Pterosauria
- Suborder: †Pterodactyloidea
- Clade: †Ornithocheiriformes
- Clade: †Ornithocheirae
- Clade: †Anhangueria
- Family: †Anhangueridae
- Genus: †Brasileodactylus; Kellner, 1984

Type species
- †Brasileodactylus araripensis Kellner, 1984

Synonyms
- "Cearadactylus" Leonardi & Borgomanero, 1983 (nomen nudum); Cearadactylus Leonardi & Borgomanero, 1985

= Brasileodactylus =

Brasileodactylus Temporal range: Early Cretaceous (Aptian–Albian), 113–110 Ma

Genus of anhanguerid pterosaur

Brasileodactylus is an extinct genus of anhanguerid pterosaur from the Early Cretaceous (late Aptian–early Albian) Romualdo Formation of the Santana Group in the Araripe Basin, northeastern Brazil. The genus Cearadactylus, once reconstructed with its snout upside down and known for its appearance in the novel Jurassic Park, was synonymized with Brasileodactylus in 2025.

Brasileodactylus was a medium-sized pterosaur and is known from six specimens, mostly lower jaws. Early studies found no head crest, but later work has reported a small crest on the snout and a blade-like crest on the lower jaw.

== History of research ==
3D mesh of referred mandible MCT.R.1473, showing the taxon's mandibular crest

The genus was named by paleontologist Alexander Wilhelm Armin Kellner in 1984 and was the first pterosaur taxon from the Romualdo Formation to be described from cranial remains. The generic name combines a reference to Brazil with Greek daktylos ("finger"), alluding to the wing finger of pterosaurs, and the specific name of the type species, Brasileodactylus araripensis, refers to the Araripe Plateau. The holotype, MN 4804-V, consists of the front of a dentary symphysis and two fragments of the mandibular rami.

Kellner originally interpreted the holotype as preserving nine pairs of alveoli, with three pairs of tooth positions in the expanded front of the jaw (the rosette) and the second pair being the largest. Later re-examinations by André Veldmeijer and colleagues in 2005 and by Rubi V. Pêgas, Anderson S. Nascimento, and colleagues in 2025 concluded that a heavily eroded, forward-facing first pair of alveoli had been overlooked. On this interpretation, MN 4804-V preserves ten pairs of alveoli, four of them in the rosette, with the third pair being the largest, matching the usual anhanguerine arrangement. In September 2018, the holotype was damaged in the Museu Nacional fire. Part of it was recovered from the debris, and casts made before the fire exist in several institutions, such as the Natural History Museum, London.

=== Referred specimens ===
Over the following decades, several other fossils were tentatively referred to Brasileodactylus, mostly because they lacked sagittal crests. Later studies questioned some of these assignments, and it was initially suggested that some of the more complete specimens might belong to other pterosaurs such as Barbosania. Revisions published in 2025 and 2026 refined the hypodigm of B. araripensis and restricted the genus to the Romualdo Formation. Following the 2025 synonymization of Cearadactylus atrox and the 2026 description of the crested mandible MCT.R.1473, the species is represented by six confirmed specimens, listed below together with the specimens that were excluded.

Specimens that have been referred to Brasileodactylus
Specimen	Material	Notes
Confirmed specimens of B. araripensis
MN 4804-V	Front of the lower jaw (dentary symphysis) and two fragments of the mandibular rami	Holotype; damaged in the 2018 fire
MN 7019-V	Skull and articulated lower jaw	Holotype of Cearadactylus atrox; destroyed in the 2018 fire, but casts survive
SMNS 55414	Partial mandible associated with three cervical vertebrae	Referred to Brasileodactylus in 2009
SMNK PAL 1281	Partial mandible	Assigned to C. atrox in 2013
MN 6517-V	Mandible	Listed as "Brasileodactylus? araripensis" in 2005; dentary crest reported in 2026
MCT.R.1473	Nearly complete lower jaw with a crest	Described in 2026
Formerly referred, now excluded
MN 4797-V	Partial rostrum and mandible from the Crato Formation	Referred as Brasileodactylus cf. araripensis in 2000; later reassigned to Ludodactylus sibbicki
AMNH 24444	Skull (429 mm (16.9 in) long), mandible and partial left wing	Referred as Brasileodactylus sp. in 2003; later found to lack the diagnostic features of B. araripensis and considered a distinct taxon
SNSB-BSPG 1991 I 27	Fragmentary skeleton with a crestless maxilla	Referred in 2009; later excluded because it lacks diagnostic mandibular elements comparable to the holotype

=== Cearadactylus ===
A pterosaur skull, MN 7019-V (formerly CB-PV-F-O93), was discovered in the Romualdo Formation of the Santana Group in the Araripe Plateau of northeastern Brazil. It consists of a skull and an articulated lower jaw with an original reconstructed length of 57 centimeters (1.87 ft). It was traded to Italy in 1983 and bought by Guido Borgomanero for his collection. It was first mentioned as a new ornithocheirid genus and species, "Cearadactylus atrox", in a short 1983 abstract by Giuseppe Leonardi and Borgomanero. Because the abstract lacked a diagnostic description or illustration, the 1983 mention is regarded as a nomen nudum under the International Code of Zoological Nomenclature. A formal description by the same authors followed in 1985. Features said to distinguish it included the elongate front teeth, the lack of a crest on the snout, a larger rosette on the dentary than on the upper jaw, and a gap between the premaxilla and dentary at the front of the jaws. The generic name combines the Brazilian state of Ceará with Greek daktylos ("finger"), referring to the wing finger of pterosaurs, and the Latin atrox ("frightful") refers to the fearsome dentition. After Borgomanero's death, his wife donated the skull to the Museu Nacional in Rio de Janeiro. In 1990, Cearadactylus appeared in the novel Jurassic Park.

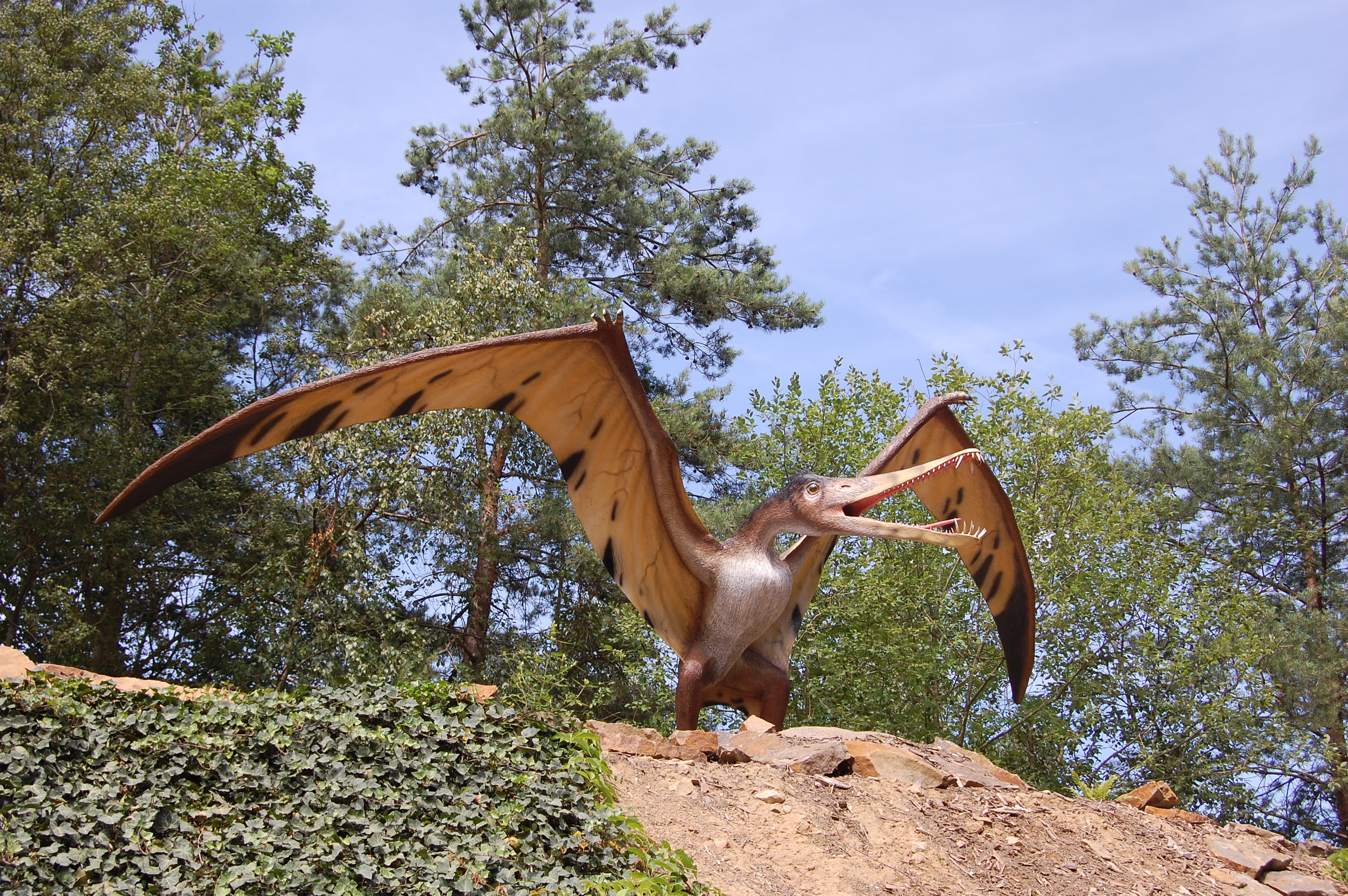
Model of "Cearadactylus" in Poland showing how the jaws were originally reconstructed

The relationships of the unusual genus remained uncertain. Leonardi and Borgomanero considered its family uncertain, Peter Wellnhofer classified it in its own family, Cearadactylidae, and David Unwin considered it a member of Ctenochasmatidae, while later authors recognized it as an anhanguerian. In 2009, the specimen was properly prepared, revealing that the front of the snout had been glued on upside down, so that the tip of the upper jaw had been interpreted as part of the lower jaw, and vice versa. Resin paste had also been used to exaggerate the size of the front teeth. These modifications were probably made by the original collectors, a common practice among poached fossils from the Santana Group, and several features of the original description turned out to be artifacts of the restoration. The discovery was first noted in a short 2010 publication by Vila Nova and colleagues and followed by a full redescription in 2014. The redescription revealed previously obscured traits, including a small premaxillary crest and a groove on the lower jaw that forks at the front. Vila Nova and colleagues noted that the skull was very similar to Brasileodactylus but kept Cearadactylus as a separate genus, based on four proposed differences: a non-flattened front tip of the dentary, the forked front of the dentary groove, the apparent absence of accessory grooves on the biting surface, and narrower spacing between the tooth sockets. An additional mandible with the same forked groove, SMNK PAL 1281, was preliminarily assigned to C. atrox in a 2013 abstract.

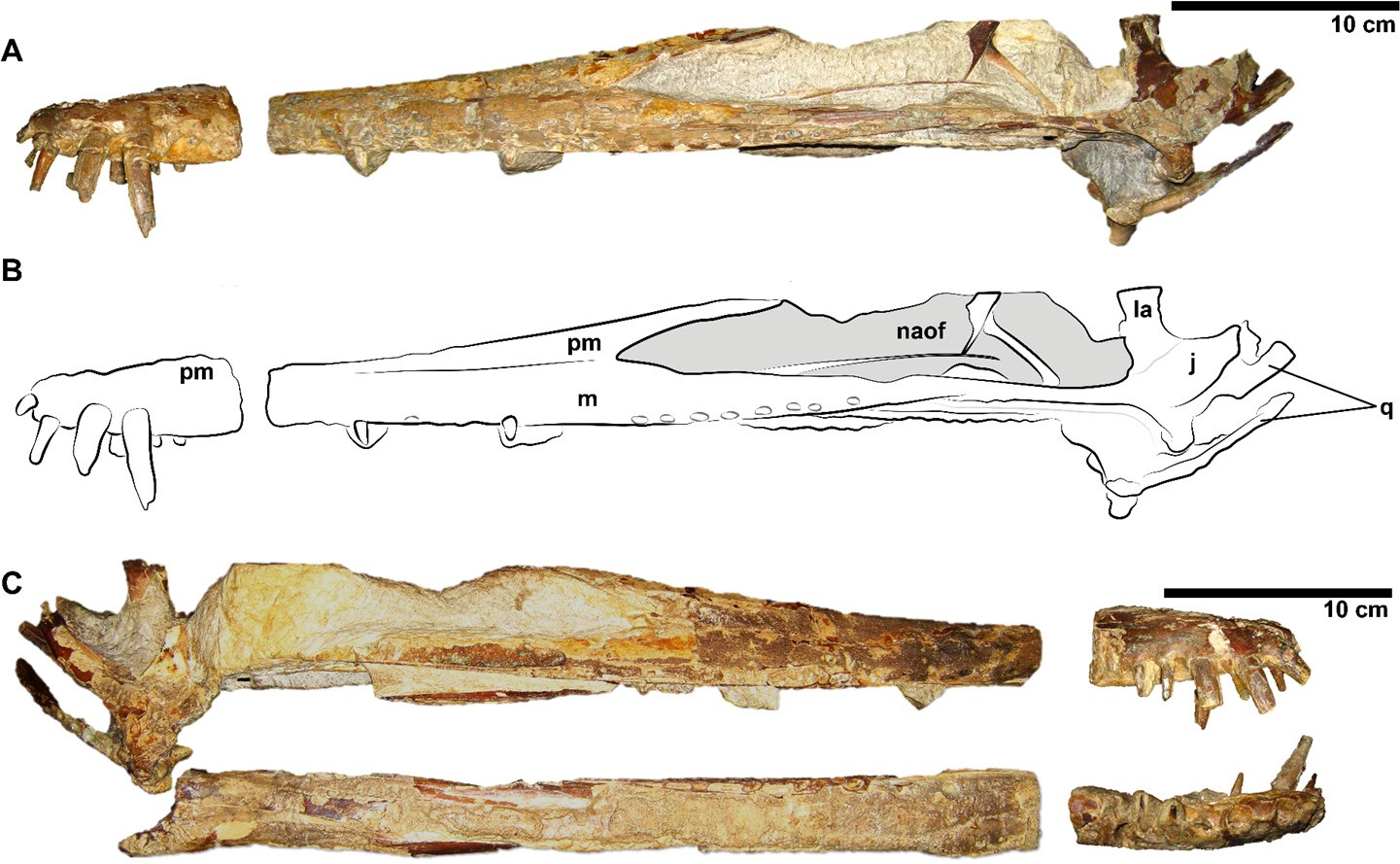
Corrected holotype skull of Cearadactylus (MN 7019-V)

In 2018, the Museu Nacional fire destroyed the original Cearadactylus atrox holotype, though casts are preserved at the Federal University of Pernambuco. In 2025, Pêgas, Nascimento and colleagues, working from observations and measurements made before the fire, concluded that C. atrox could not be distinguished from Brasileodactylus araripensis and was its junior subjective synonym. They argued that each of the four proposed differences could be explained by preservation or oversight: the front of the dentary is heavily eroded in the Brasileodactylus holotype, so its tip shape and the forking of the groove are unpreserved rather than absent; the Cearadactylus holotype has faint accessory grooves that had been overlooked; the gaps between the first five alveoli are roughly equal to or smaller than the alveolar diameter in both holotypes; and the referred mandibles SMNS 55414 and SMNK PAL 1281 show both the forked groove and the accessory grooves. They also reported that these specimens share a paired row of small nerve and blood vessel openings in the rosette.

In 1993, Fabio Marco Dalla Vecchia named a second species, Cearadactylus ligabuei, honoring Giancarlo Ligabue, director of the Centro Studi Ricerche Ligabue in Venice. It is based on a heavily damaged crestless skull, CCSRL 12692/12713, 403 millimeters (15.9 in) long and made of two pieces glued together by fossil traders. Dalla Vecchia himself doubted that the species belonged in Cearadactylus and named it Cearadactylus? ligabuei. Later authors have rejected a close relationship to Brasileodactylus (formerly Cearadactylus), and the 2025 revision concluded that the specimen needs a detailed taxonomic reassessment.

== Description ==
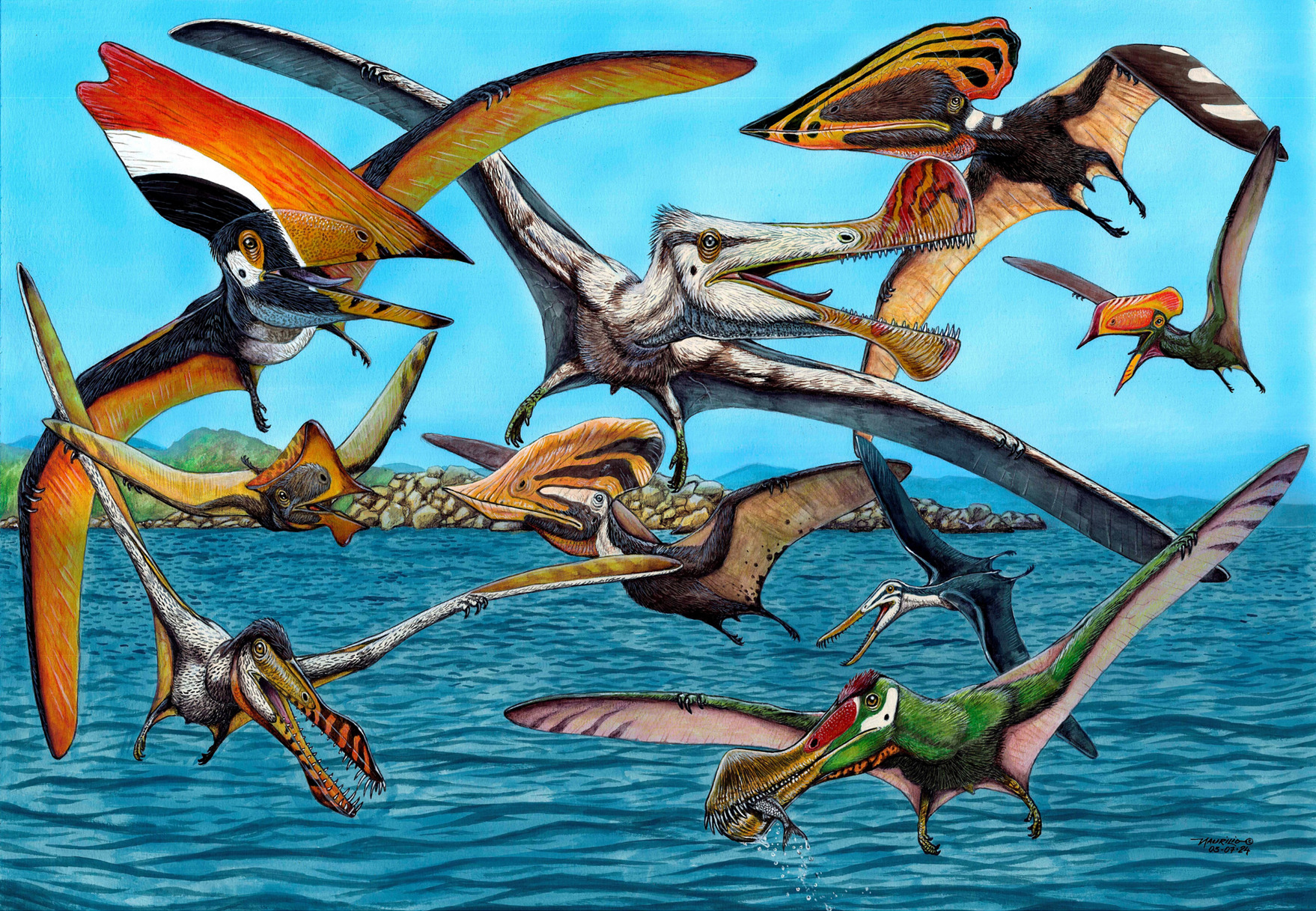
Life restorations of Brasileodactylus (lower middle right) and other pterosaurs known from the Romualdo Formation

Brasileodactylus was a medium-sized anhanguerid pterosaur, with an estimated wingspan of about 4 m (13 ft) and a body mass of about 10 kg (22 lb). It had a long, pointed snout, and the front of its lower jaw expanded into a spoon-shaped rosette that was widest at the third pair of tooth sockets (alveoli). In the nearly complete lower jaw MCT.R.1473, which is 290 mm (11 in) long as preserved, the fused front part of the jaw (the dentary symphysis) measures 205 mm (8.1 in), about 70% of the preserved length.

According to Pêgas and colleagues (2025) and Nascimento and colleagues (2026), several unique features (autapomorphies) of the dentary symphysis distinguish B. araripensis. A groove runs along the midline all the way to the tip of the jaw and forks between the first pair of alveoli, with small diagonal grooves branching off to the sides. Between the second and fifth alveoli, a row of small openings for nerves and blood vessels runs along each side of the groove. At the very tip of the jaw, between the first pair of teeth, is a triangular bony projection (an odontoid process, or "pseudotooth") with a sharp apex and a blunt biting surface, unlike the broader, blunter one of Anhanguera. Farther back, between the tenth and eleventh alveoli, the ridges bordering the groove rise and merge into a blunt elevation, which is weakly developed in smaller specimens and pronounced in large, mature individuals.

=== Dentition ===
The teeth are conical and somewhat flattened, with fine ridges and grooves running along the enamel, and, as in other anhanguerines, they vary in size along the jaws. The first four pairs of teeth, in the rosette, are long, slender and strongly curved inward. The first two pairs point forward and upward, and the third and fourth pairs are the largest in the lower jaw. Immediately behind the rosette, the fifth and sixth teeth are smaller than the fourth and seventh and sit in a constricted, downward-curving section of the tooth row, where the fourth to seventh alveoli lie lower than the third and eighth when seen from the side. This is a feature that characterizes the subfamily Anhanguerinae.

=== Crests and ontogeny ===
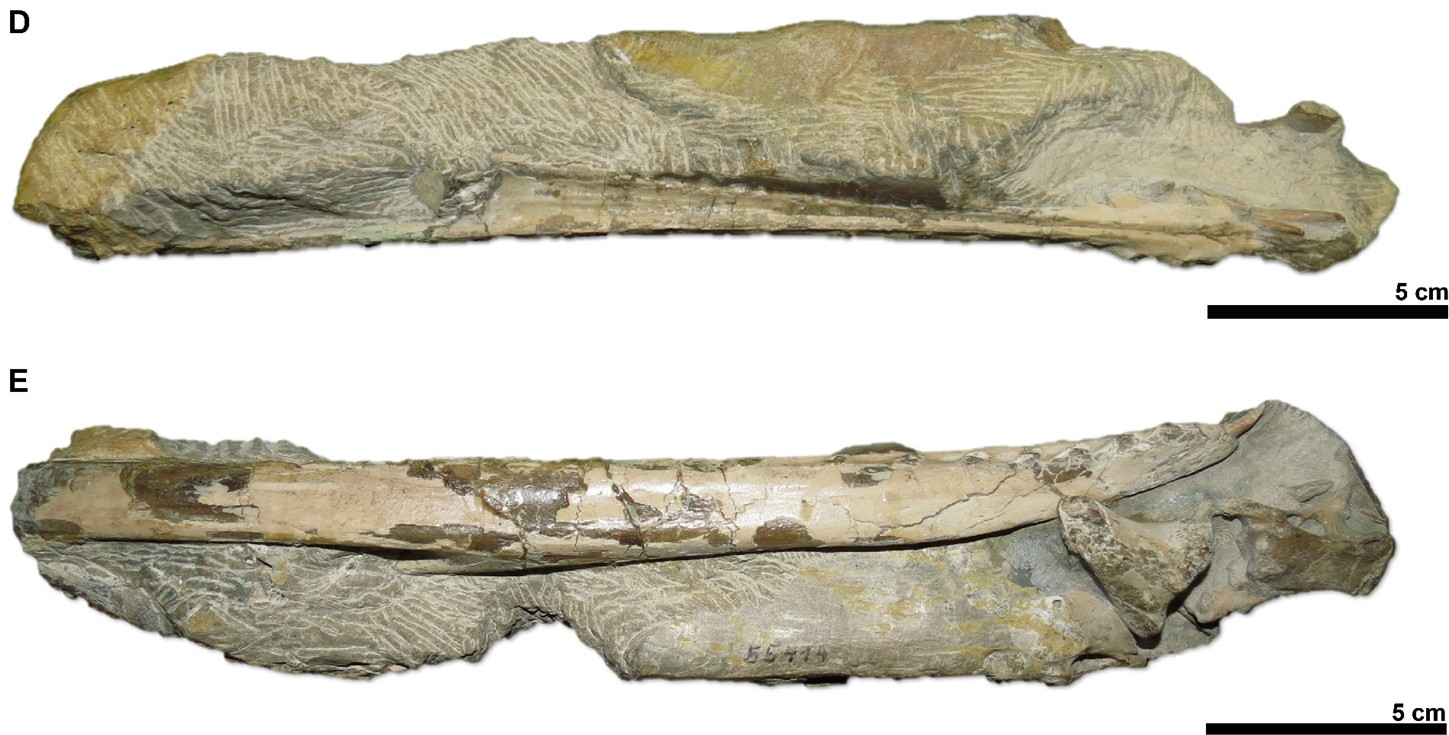
Assigned specimen without crest

Early research regarded Brasileodactylus as lacking crests on both the snout and the lower jaw, unlike most other anhanguerids. Preparation of the Cearadactylus skull MN 7019-V later revealed a small premaxillary crest on the snout. In 2026, Nascimento and colleagues used high-resolution micro-computed tomography to describe MCT.R.1473, a nearly complete lower jaw held by the Museu de Ciências da Terra. It preserves the first reported crest on the lower jaw of B. araripensis: a blade-like crest on the underside of the dentary, 127 mm (5.0 in) long and 34 mm (1.3 in) deep, that begins at the tip of the jaw, is deepest between the seventh and eighth teeth, and ends just in front of the tenth tooth. The same study reported a dentary crest in a second specimen, MN 6517-V, and concluded that Brasileodactylus had both premaxillary and mandibular crests.

The authors noted that crests are absent in the smaller known specimens and present only in the largest, and that the bone surface of MCT.R.1473 is smooth and dense, unlike the porous bone typical of juvenile pterosaurs. They suggested that the crests developed late in ontogeny, as documented in Anhanguera and Nyctosaurus, and that sexual dimorphism or mutual sexual selection may have influenced crest expression, with the crest serving as a visual signal and one sex possibly starting to grow it earlier than the other.

== Classification ==
Kellner first assigned Brasileodactylus to the Ornithocheiridae in 1984, changed this to the more cautious Pterodactyloidea incertae sedis in 1991, and in 2000 affirmed a close affinity to the Anhangueridae. Unwin considered it part of Anhanguera in 2001 but later retracted this, Eberhard Frey suggested in 2003 that it was a species of Coloborhynchus, and Unwin and David Martill suggested in 2007 that Ludodactylus was a junior synonym of Brasileodactylus. Recent work has not followed the last proposal: Ludodactylus is treated as a separate genus, and the Crato Formation specimen once referred to Brasileodactylus was reassigned to L. sibbicki.

A 2019 phylogenetic analysis by Adele H. Pentland and colleagues found Cearadactylus in a derived position within the Anhangueria, just outside the Ornithocheirae, which by their definition is the clade containing the families Ornithocheiridae and Anhangueridae. Other studies, however, concluded that Cearadactylus and Brasileodactylus are members of the family Anhangueridae, and more specifically of the subfamily Anhanguerinae, as the sister taxon to Maaradactylus.

A 2025 revision of the systematics and nomenclature of the Ornithocheiriformes by Pêgas, covering both the PhyloCode and the ICZN, places Brasileodactylus within the Ornithocheiriformes, Anhangueroidea, Anhangueria, Anhangueridae and Anhanguerinae. Analyses that include the combined Brasileodactylus and Cearadactylus material recover Brasileodactylus araripensis as the sister taxon of Maaradactylus kellneri. The two are united by an odontoid process at the tip of the dentary and by a palatal ridge that widens to occupy the whole palatal surface between the alveoli.

Below is a cladogram showing the results of the phylogenetic analysis presented by Nascimento and colleagues in 2026:

- Anhangueria
  - Hamipteridae
  - Anhangueridae
    - Tropeognathinae
    - - Coloborhynchinae
      - Anhanguerinae
        - - Caulkicephalus
          - - Guidraco
            - Ludodactylus
        - - Liaoningopterus
          - - Anhanguera spp.
            - - Brasileodactylus
              - Maaradactylus

== See also ==
- Timeline of pterosaur research
