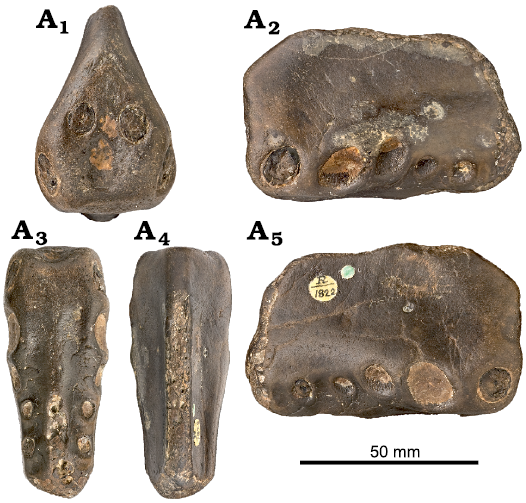
- Holotype jaw fragment of C. clavirostris in multiple views

Scientific classification
- Kingdom: Animalia
- Phylum: Chordata
- Class: Reptilia
- Order: †Pterosauria
- Suborder: †Pterodactyloidea
- Clade: †Ornithocheirae
- Genus: †Coloborhynchus; Owen, 1874

Type species
- †Coloborhynchus clavirostris Owen, 1874

Other species
- †C. capito? (Seeley, 1870); †C. fluviferox? Jacobs et al., 2019

Synonyms
- List of synonyms: Genus synonymy; "Ptenodactylus" Seeley, 1869 (nomen nudum) Synonyms of C. capito; Ornithocheirus capito Seeley, 1870; Nicorhynchus capito (Seeley, 1870) Synonyms of C. fluviferox; Nicorhynchus fluviferox (Jacobs et al., 2019)

= Coloborhynchus =

Coloborhynchus Temporal range: Early Cretaceous, 140–136 Ma

Genus of anhanguerid pterosaur from the Cretaceous period

Coloborhynchus is a genus of pterodactyloid pterosaur belonging to the family Anhangueridae, though it has also been recovered as a member of the Ornithocheiridae in some studies. Coloborhynchus is known from the Lower Cretaceous of England (Valanginian age, 140 to 136 million years ago), and depending on which species are included, possibly the Albian and Cenomanian ages (113 to 93.9 million years ago) as well. Coloborhynchus was once thought to be the largest known toothed pterosaur, however, a specimen of the closely related Tropeognathus is now thought to have had a larger wingspan.

== History and classification ==
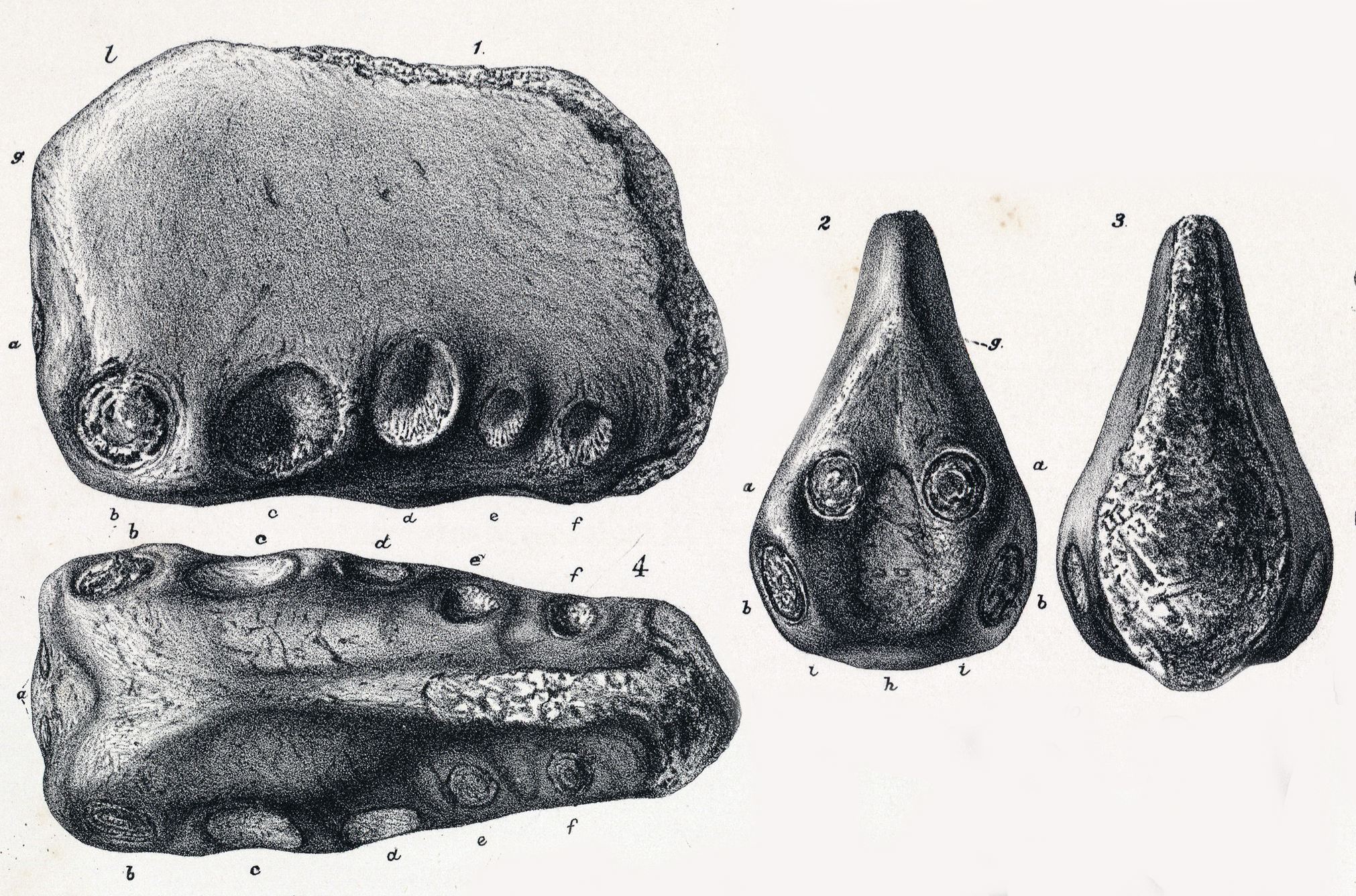
Lithograph of the C. clavirostris holotype

Like many ornithocheiroid pterosaurs named during the 19th century, Coloborhynchus has a highly convoluted history of classification. Over the years numerous species have been assigned to it, and often, species have been shuffled between Coloborhynchus and related genera by various researchers.

In 1874 Richard Owen, rejecting the creation by Harry Govier Seeley of the genus Ornithocheirus, named a species Coloborhynchus clavirostris based on holotype BMNH 1822, a partial snout from the Hastings Beds of the Wealden Group of East Sussex, England. The genus name means "maimed beak", a reference to the damaged and eroded condition of the fossil; the specific name means "key snout", referring to its form in cross-section. Owen also reclassified Ornithocheirus cuvieri and O. sedgwickii as species within the genus Coloborhynchus, though he did not designate any of these three as the type species. Owen considered the defining trait of the genus to be the location of the front tooth pairs high on the side of the upper jaws. However, in 1913 Reginald Walter Hooley concluded that this location was an artefact of the erosion and that the genus was indistinguishable from Criorhynchus simus, the second genus and species Owen erected in 1874. Hooley also ignored Owen's reassignment of the two former Ornithocheirus species, leaving them in that genus. In 1967, Kuhn agreed with Hooley that Coloborhynchus clavirostris was a synonym of Criorhynchus simus. Furthermore, Kuhn was the first to formally designate C. clavirostris as the type species of the genus, rather than one of the Ornithocheirus species. Most later researchers followed these opinions, regarding Coloborhynchus as invalid relative to Criorhynchus.

This changed in 1994 when Yuong-Nam Lee named Coloborhynchus wadleighi for a snout found in 1992 in the Albian age Paw Paw Formation Texas. The revival of the genus meant that of several related species, then assigned to other genera, had to be re-evaluated to determine whether or not they actually belonged to Coloborhynchus. In 2008, Taissa Rodrigues and Alexander Kellner re-formulated the key features of Coloborhynchus, again based mainly on the unique positions of the tooth sockets. Rodrigues and Kellner argued that Lee's C. wadleighi, which possessed some differences in the skull and teeth from C. clavirostris, and from an earlier time period, belonged in its own genus, which they named Uktenadactylus.

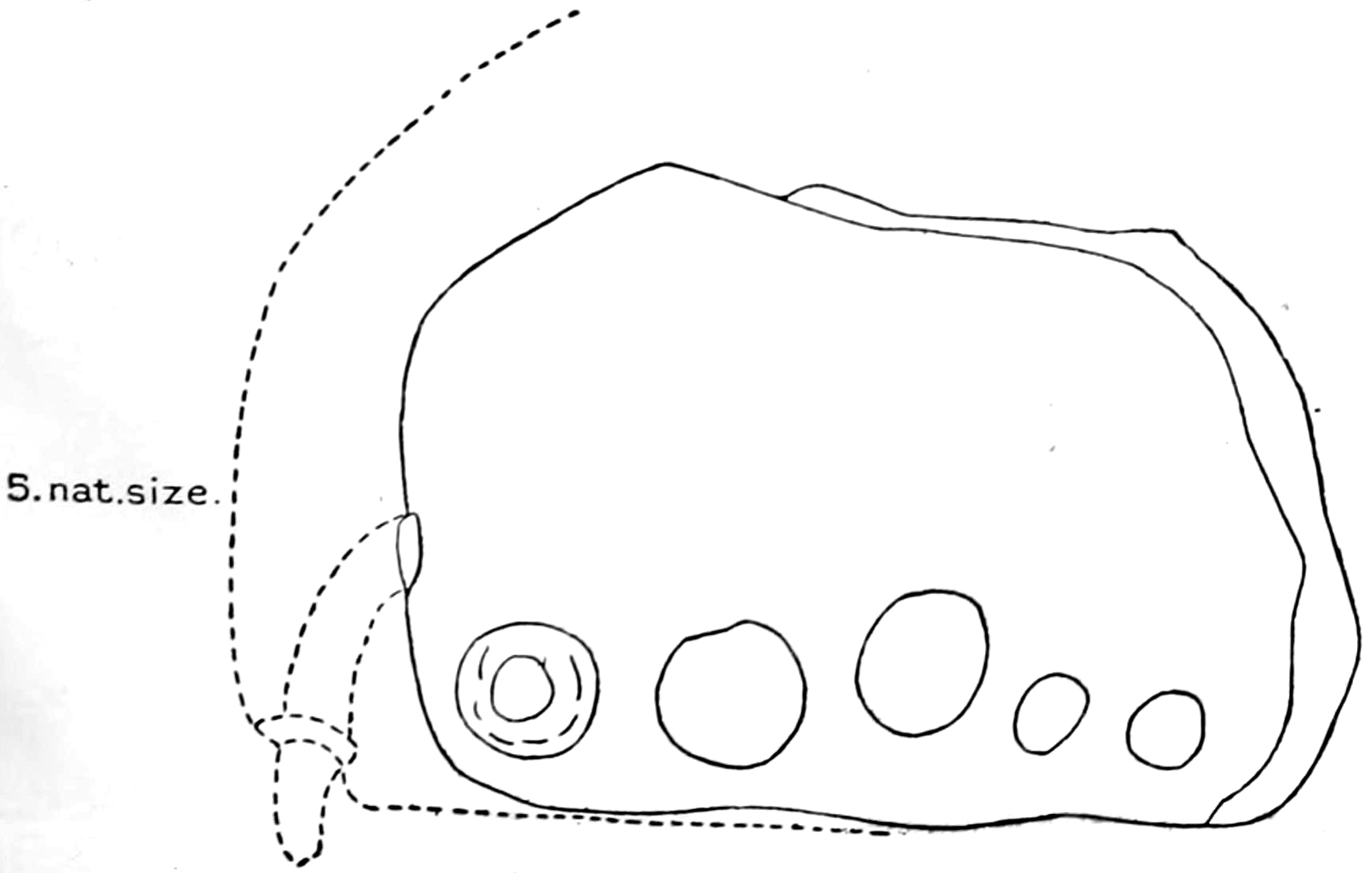
1914 illustration of the C. clavirostris holotype with dotted lines reconstructing what he thought was worn away jaw margin

A partial lower jaw originally named Tropeognathus robustus from the Romualdo Member of the Santana Formation in Brazil was assigned to Coloborhynchus in 2001 by Fastnacht, as Coloborhynchus robustus. In 2002, David Unwin supported this position, and also synonymized the more well-known species Anhanguera piscator with C. robustus. Rodrigues and Kellner disagreed with this classification, however, noting that both did not possess the unique straightened crest beginning at the snout tip, or sideways pointed teeth, of C. clavirostris. Instead, Rodrigues and Kellner regarded both Anhanguera robustus and Anhanguera piscator as valid species of Anhanguera.

Another Brazilian species from the Romualdo Member was named Coloborhynchus spielbergi by Veldmeijer in 2003. It shares one or two characters in common with C. clavirostris (such as a flattened upper surface of the snout), though Rodrigues and Kellner regarded them as dubious, and noted that they are also present in other genera. Kellner recombined it as Anhanguera spielbergi in 2006. Similarly, Kellner excluded C. araripensis (formerly assigned to the genus Santanadactylus from the genus, based on lack of comparable diagnostic features. Unwin, in 2001, assigned the species Siroccopteryx moroccensis to Coloborhynchus, based on its similarity to C. wadleighi (type species of Uktenadactylus). Kellner, who regarded Uktenadactylus as a distinct genus in 2008, also regarded Siroccopteryx as distinct, and noted that like the other species assigned to Coloborhynchus, lacked its unique characteristics of the tooth row, a position also supported by Fastnacht in 2001.

In 2001, Unwin also reassigned the two other species from the Cambridge Greensand to Coloborhynchus: C. capito and C. sedgwickii, the second of which being one of the original members of the genus according to Richard Owen in 1874. According to Kellner, C. capito is too incomplete to fully compare to C. clavirostris, and its precise classification is open to debate. He noted that C. sedgwicki does not possess the unique features of C. clavirostris (in fact it lacks a crest altogether), and may instead belong to the same genus as "Ornithocheirus" compressirostris (=Lonchodectes).

In 2013, Rodrigues and Kellner considered Coloborhynchus to be monotypic, containing only C. clavirostris, and placed most other species in other genera, or declared them nomina dubia. In 2018, Jacobs et al. named a new species of Coloborhynchus, C. fluviferox from the Ifezouane Formation of the Kem Kem Group of Morocco based on a partial snout, and also tentatively referred another specimen from the same locality to a different, unnamed species. A 2020 review of Coloborhynchinae by Holgado and Pêgas moved both C. capito and C. fluviferox to a new genus, Nicorhynchus, and also referred the unnamed Ifezouane Formation coloborhynchine to N. fluviferox. However, a 2023 review of Kem Kem pterosaurs found the traits that distinguish Nicorhynchus from Coloborhynchus to be subtle enough to justify their synonymy, stating that the material was damaged and fragmentary enough to support this.

=== List of species and synonyms ===
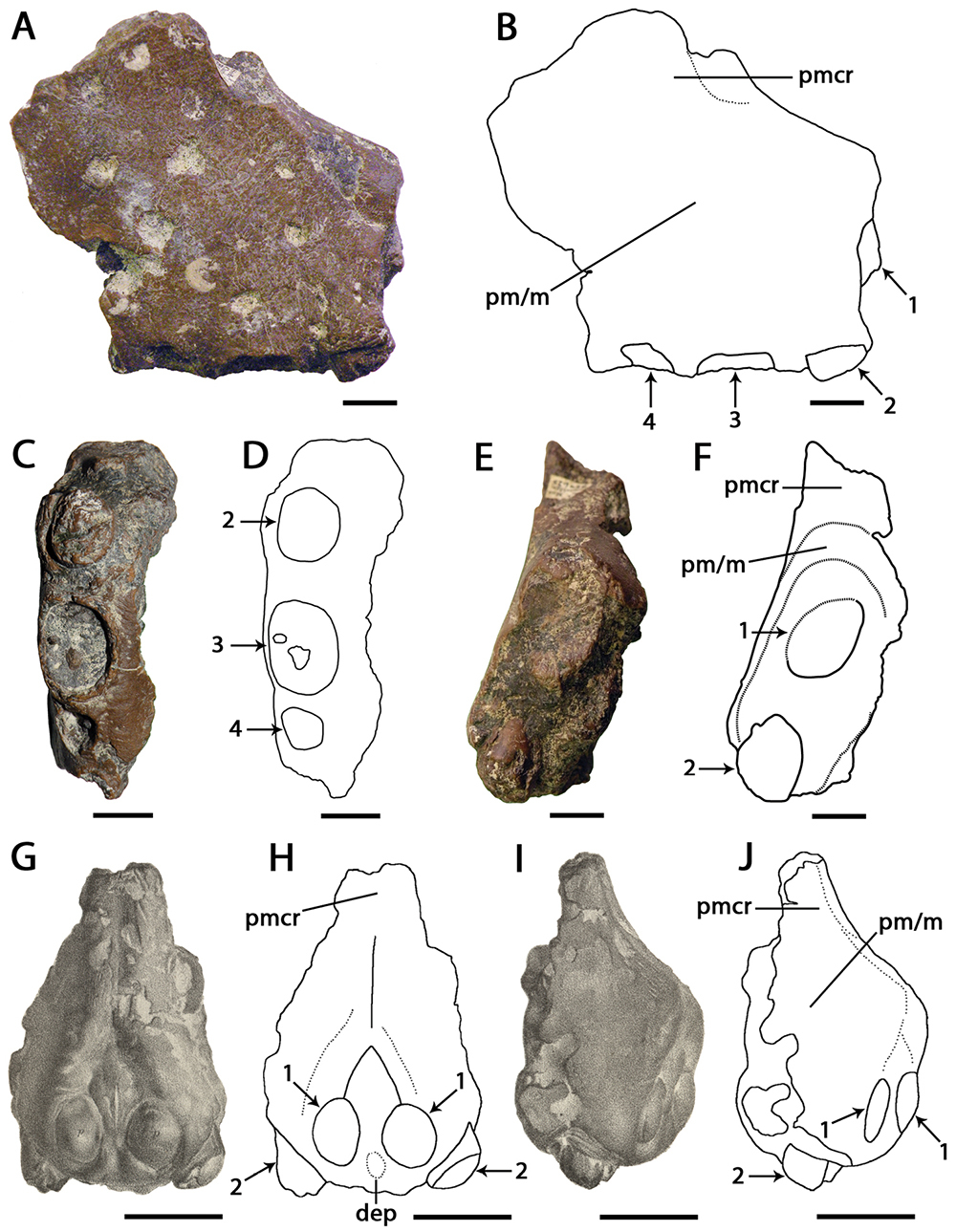
Holotype and referred specimen of the possible species C. capito

Species which have been assigned to Coloborhynchus by various scientists over the years include:

- C. clavirostris Owen, 1874, the type species
- ?C. ligabuei (Dalla Vecchia, 1993) = Cearadactylus ligabuei Dalla Vecchia, 1993 [also classified as Anhanguera ligabuei]
- ?C. piscator (Kellner & Tomida, 2000) = Anhanguera piscator Kellner & Tomida, 2000 [also classified as Anhanguera or C. robustus]
- C. cuvieri (Bowerbank, 1851) = Ornithocheirus cuvieri (Newton, 1888) = Pterodactylus cuvieri Bowerbank, 1851 [now classified as Cimoliopterus]
- C. sedgwicki (Owen 1859) = Ornithocheirus sedgwicki (Newton, 1888) = Pterodactylus sedgwickii Owen, 1859 [now classified as Aerodraco]
- C. araripensis (Wellnhofer, 1985) = Santanadactylus araripensis Wellnhofer, 1985 now seen as a nomen dubium
- ?C. robustus (Wellnhofer, 1987) = Tropeognathus robustus Wellnhofer, 1987 [now seen as a nomen dubium]
- C. wadleighi Lee, 1994 [also classified as Uktenadactylus]
- C. moroccensis (Mader & Kellner, 1999) = Siroccopteryx moroccensis Mader & Kellner 1999
- C. piscator (Kellner & Tomida, 2000) = Anhanguera piscator Kellner & Tomida, 2000
- C. spielbergi Veldmeijer, 2003 [now classified as Maaradactylus]
- C. capito (Seeley, 1870) = Ornithocheirus capito Seeley, 1870 = "Ptenodactylus capito" Seeley, 1869 [now classified as Nicorhynchus]
- C. fluviferox Jacobs, Martill, Ibrahim & Longrich, 2018 [now classified as Nicorhynchus]

== Description ==
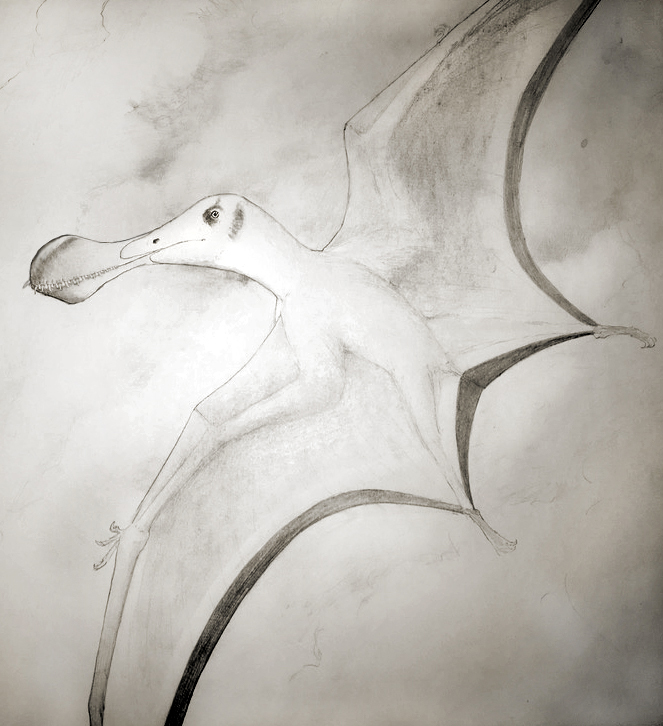
Life restoration of the possible species C. fluviferox

The type specimen of Coloborhynchus is known only from a partial upper jaw. Therefore, according to Rodrigues and Kellner's 2008 re-evaluation on Coloborhynchus clavirostris, it can only be differentiated from its relatives based on its unique combination of tooth socket positions. In Coloborhynchus, the two front teeth pointed forward and were higher on the jaw than the other teeth, while the next three pairs of teeth pointed to the sides. The final two (preserved) pairs of teeth pointed downward. Finally, a unique oval depression was located below the first pair of teeth.

Like the related Anhanguera and Uktenadactylus, the tip of the snout flared out into a wider rosette, in contrast to the narrow posterior jaws. However, whereas the rosettes of species typically assigned to Anhanguera were rounded and spoon-shaped, those of Coloborhynchus were robust and box-shaped.

Also like its close relatives, Coloborhynchus had a keel-shaped crest on the front of its jaws, though it was broad and thinned from base to top, rather than the uniformly thin crests of its relatives. This kind of thickened crest is also seen in Siroccopteryx moroccensis, which may be its closest relative or a member of the same genus. It also had a straight, rather than curved, front margin, unlike its relatives, and begins at the tip of the snout, rather than further back as in other species.

A second specimen showing all of these same unique features was reported to Brazilian paleontologist Alexander Kellner by Darren Naish in 2007, and likely represents a second specimen of C. clavirostris, though it has not yet been described.

The possible species Coloborhynchus capito represents the second largest known ornithocheirid (after a Tropeognathus specimen), and indeed the largest toothed pterosaur known. A referred specimen from the Cambridge Greensand of England described in 2011 consists of a very large upper jaw tip which displays the tooth characteristics that distinguish C. capito from other species. The jaw tip is nearly 10 cm tall and 5.6 cm wide, with teeth up to 1.3 cm in base diameter. If the proportions of this specimen were consistent with other known species of Coloborhynchus, the total skull length could have been up to 75 cm, leading to an estimated wingspan of 7 metres (23 ft). However, this species may belong to a different genus.

A rostrum fragment diagnostic to Coloborhynchus sp. is known from the Wessex Formation of England.

== Classification ==
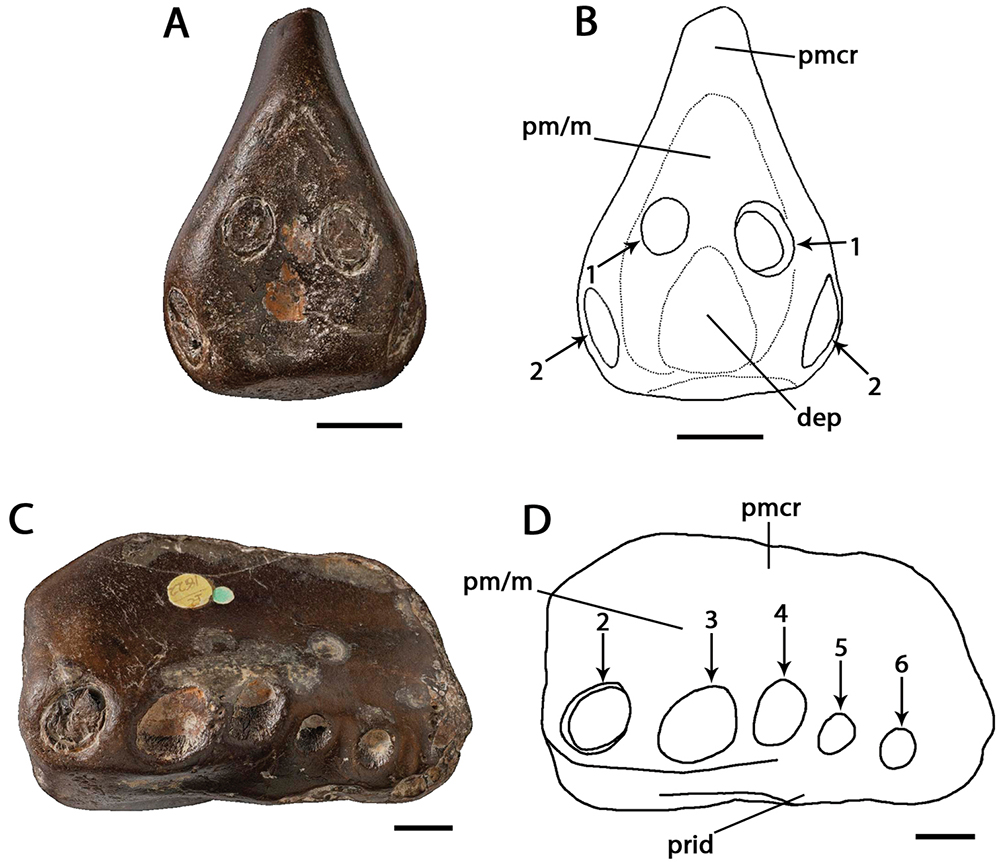
C. clavirostris holotype with interpretative line drawings

A topology made by Andres and Myers in 2013 placed the species Coloborhynchus clavirostris and C. wadleighi (now generally considered as Uktenadactylus) within the family Ornithocheiridae as sister taxa to Ornithocheirus simus, and the family itself is placed within the more inclusive clade Ornithocheirae. Later, in 2019, Pentland et al. recovered a similar result to the one by Andres and Myers in 2013 where Coloborhynchus is the sister taxon of Ornithocheirus. Their cladogram is shown on the left. In 2018, Jacobs et al. also recovered a similar cladogram compared to Andres and Myers (2013), where both Coloborhynchus and Siroccopteryx were assigned to the Ornithocheiridae, however, unlike the study made by Andres and Myers, they used the name Uktenadactylus wadleighi to refer to C. wadleighi in their analysis. They published their conclusion in 2019. However, many subsequent analyses made in 2019 and 2020 have recovered Coloborhynchus within the family Anhangueridae, more specifically within the subfamily Coloborhynchinae. The cladogram on the left shows a phylogenetic analysis made by Borja Holgado and Rubi Pêgas in 2020.

Topology 1: Pentland et al. (2019).

- Anhangueria
  - Guidraco
  - - - - Brasileodactylus
        - Ludodactylus
      - - Cearadactylus
        - Ornithocheirae
          - Anhangueridae
            - Liaoningopterus
            - Anhanguera
          - Ornithocheiridae
            - Tropeognathus
            - Ornithocheirinae
              - Coloborhynchus
              - - Ornithocheirus
                - - Ferrodraco
                  - Mythunga

Topology 2: Holgado & Pêgas (2020).

- Anhangueridae
  - Tropeognathinae
    - - Siroccopteryx
      - Tropeognathus
    - - Mythunga
      - Ferrodraco
  - Coloborhynchinae
    - Aerodraco
    - - Coloborhynchus
      - - Nicorhynchus
        - Uktenadactylus
  - Anhanguerinae
    - - Caulkicephalus
      - Guidraco
      - Ludodactylus
    - - Liaoningopterus
      - - Cearadactylus
        - Maaradactylus
      - Anhanguera

== Paleobiology ==
Similar to most anhanguerids, Coloborhynchus is traditionally thought to be an oceanic piscivore. However one study found it among the carnivorous pterosaur taxa, as opposed to several other piscivore and insectivore species.

== See also ==
- List of pterosaur genera
- Timeline of pterosaur research
