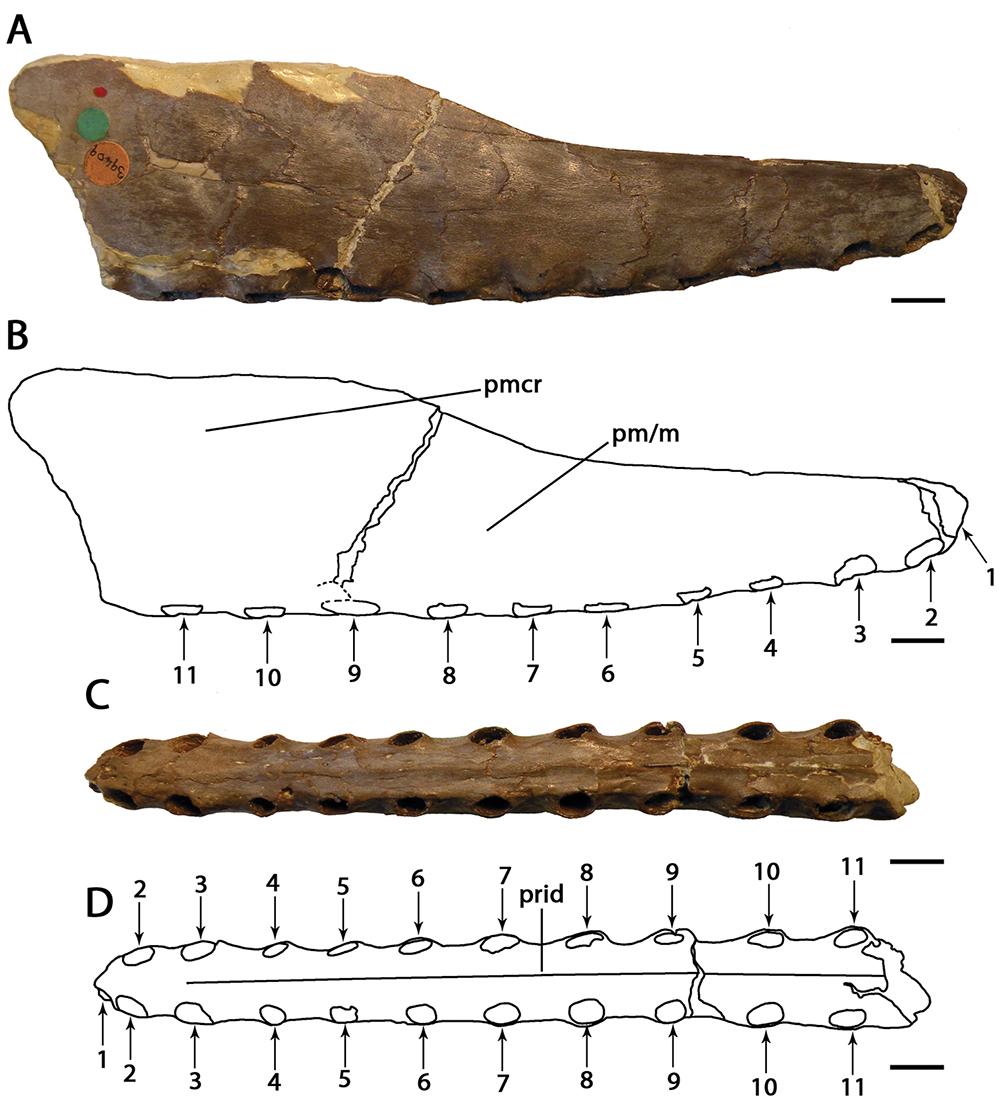
- Holotype snout tip of C. cuvieri shown from the right side and below

Scientific classification
- Kingdom: Animalia
- Phylum: Chordata
- Class: Reptilia
- Order: †Pterosauria
- Suborder: †Pterodactyloidea
- Clade: †Ornithocheirae
- Clade: †Targaryendraconia
- Family: †Cimoliopteridae
- Genus: †Cimoliopterus; Rodrigues & Kellner, 2013

Type species
- †Pterodactylus cuvieri Bowerbank, 1851

Other species
- †C. dunni Myers, 2015; †C. colorhinus Seeley, 1870

Synonyms
- Genus synonymy: Lonchodectes? Hooley, 1914; Synonyms of C. cuvieri: Pterodactylus cuvieri Bowerbank, 1851; "Ptenodactylus" cuvieri (Bowerbank, 1851) Seeley, 1869; Ornithocheirus cuvieri (Bowerbank, 1851) Seeley, 1870; Coloborhynchus cuvieri (Bowerbank, 1851) Owen, 1874; Anhanguera cuvieri (Bowerbank, 1851) Bakhurina & Unwin, 1995; Ornithocheirus brachyrhinus? Seeley, 1870; Ornithocheirus dentatus? Seeley, 1870; Ornithocheirus denticulatus? Seeley, 1870; Ornithocheirus enchorhynchus? Seeley, 1870; Ornithocheirus scaphorhynchus? Seeley, 1870; Lonchodectes scaphorhynchus? (Seeley, 1870) Hooley, 1914; Ornithocheirus xyphorhynchus? Seeley, 1870; Pterodactylus fittoni? Owen, 1859; Ornithocheirus fittoni? (Owen, 1859) Seeley, 1870; Anhanguera fittoni? (Owen, 1859) Unwin, 2001; Pterodactylus compressirostris? Owen, 1851; Ornithocheirus compressirostris? (Owen, 1851) Seeley, 1870; Lonchodectes compressirostris? (Owen, 1851) Hooley, 1914; Synonyms of C. colorhinus: "Ptenodactylus" colorhinus Seeley, 1869; Ornithocheirus colorhinus Seeley, 1870; Camposipterus colorhinus? (Seeley, 1870) Rodrigues & Kellner, 2013

= Cimoliopterus =

Cimoliopterus Temporal range: Cenomanian ~100–94 Ma

Genus of pterosaur from the Cretaceous period

Cimoliopterus is a genus of pterosaur that lived during the Late Cretaceous in what is now England and the United States. The first known specimen, consisting of the front part of a snout including part of a crest, was discovered in the Grey Chalk Subgroup of Kent, England, and described as the new species Pterodactylus cuvieri in 1851. The specific name cuvieri honoured the palaeontologist George Cuvier, and the genus Pterodactylus was then used for many pterosaurs of species that are no longer thought to be closely related. It was among the first pterosaurs to be depicted as sculptures, in Crystal Palace Park in the 1850s. The species was subsequently assigned to various other genera, including Ornithocheirus and Anhanguera. In 2013, the species was moved to a new genus, as C. cuvieri; the generic name Cimoliopterus is derived from the Greek words for "chalk" and "wing". Other specimens and species have also been assigned to or synonymised with the species with various levels of certainty. In 2015, a snout discovered in the Britton Formation of Texas, US, was named as a new species in the genus, C. dunni. A species from the Cambridge Greensand of England originally assigned to Ornithocheirus was assigned to Cimoliopterus in 2025, as C. colorhinus.

C. cuvieri is estimated to have had a wingspan of 3.5 metres (11 ft), and C. dunni is thought to have been similar to C. cuvieri in size. One C. colorhinus specimen is estimated to have had a wingspan of 5 metres (16 ft). Cimoliopterus can be distinguished from related pterosaurs in features such as having a premaxillary crest that begins hindward on the snout, in having a ridge on the palate that extends forwards until the third pair of tooth sockets, and in the spacing and proportions of the tooth sockets. Unlike similar pterosaurs, the tip of the snout is only subtly expanded to the sides. C. cuvieri and C. dunni differ from each other in various details in the configuration of these features; for example, the crest of C. cuvieri begins by the seventh tooth socket, whereas that of C. dunni begins at the fourth. More completely known related genera were fairly large pterosaurs, with proportionally large skulls, long jaws and tooth-rows, often with large, rounded crests at the front of the jaws. The teeth at the front of the jaws were large and recurved; further back, the teeth were smaller, slightly recurved, and well-spaced. As pterosaurs, Cimoliopterus would have been covered in pycnofibres (hair-like filaments), and had extensive wing-membranes, which were distended by long wing-fingers.

While long considered an ornithocheiran, the affinities of C. cuvieri were unclear due to the fragmentary nature of it and other English pterosaurs, until more complete relatives were reported from Brazil in the 1980s. Cimoliopterus was moved to the family Cimoliopteridae within the clade Targaryendraconia in 2019, with its closest relative being Camposipterus. That C. cuvieri from England and C. dunni from North America were so similar despite living on opposite sides of the North Atlantic Ocean indicates they became less isolated from each other than other animal groups because they could fly. This kind of pterosaur was probably adapted for long-distance oceanic soaring, which is also supported by their fossils mainly being found in marine settings. While they may have been proficient in water, their terrestrial abilities were limited due to their having short hindlimbs but long forelimbs. They possibly fed while flying by dipping their long jaws into water and catching fish with their interlocking teeth. While some have suggested the premaxillary crests were used to stabilise the jaws while submerged in water during feeding, they may have been used as display structures.

== History ==
=== Discovery and early interpretations ===
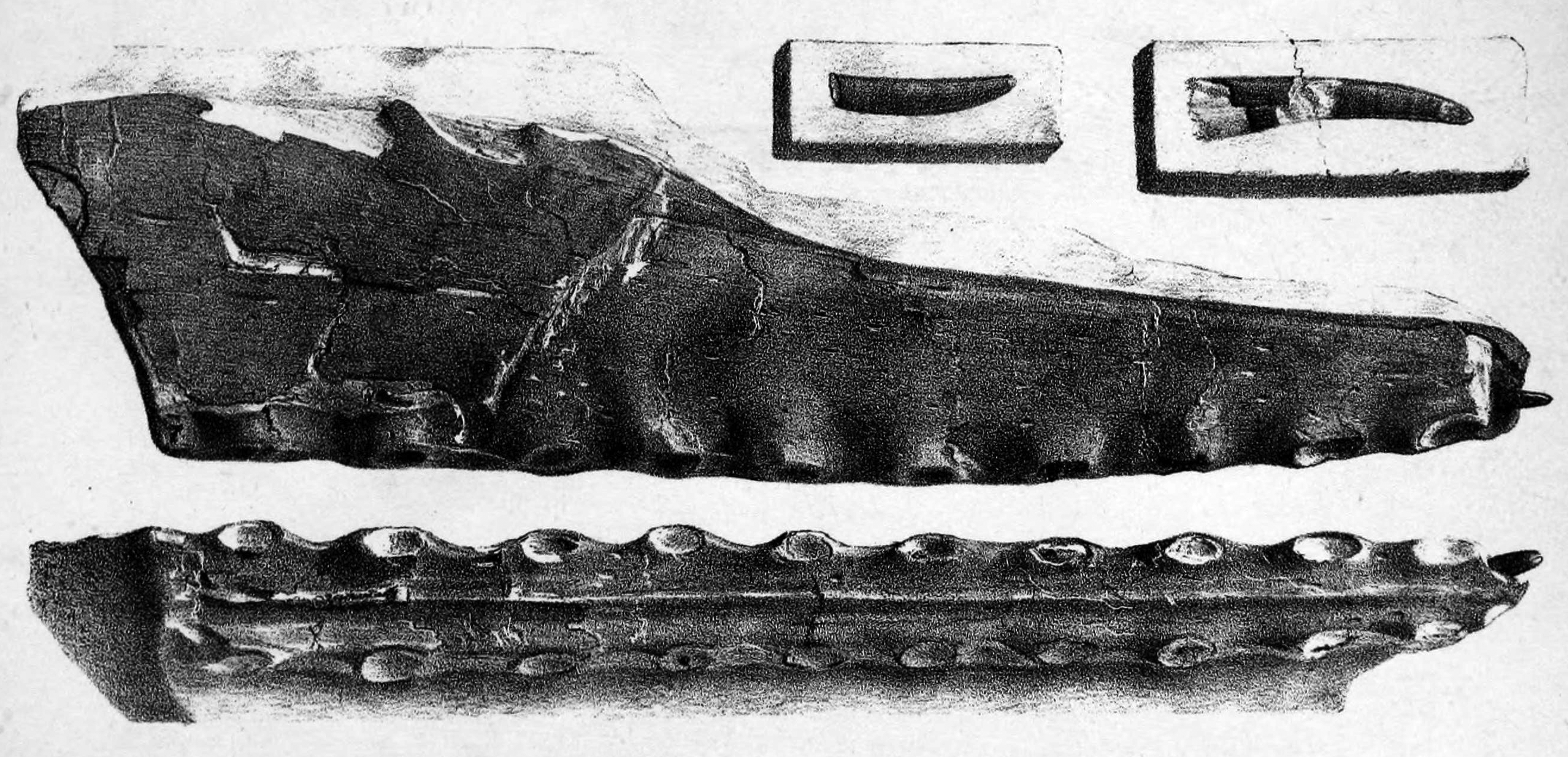
Lithograph showing the C. cuvieri holotype and its now lost teeth, as figured by Bowerbank in 1851

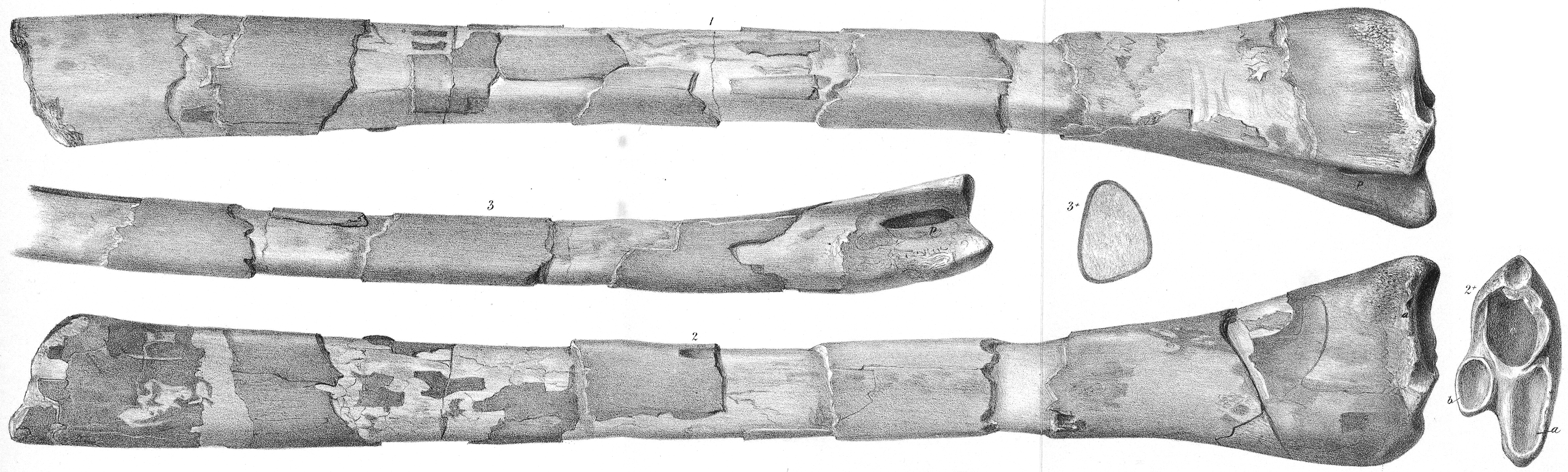
Wing-finger bone that Owen assigned to then P. cuvieri in 1851

The taxonomic history of Cimoliopterus and related pterosaurs from the Cretaceous of England has been described as confusing by modern pterosaur researchers, since many of them were described from very fragmentary remains, and named using convoluted nomenclatural schemes of the Victorian era. Prior to these discoveries, many of the hollow, thin-walled pterosaur bones found in England were thought to have belonged to birds. In 1851, the British naturalist James Scott Bowerbank described a large pterosaur snout he had obtained, which was found in the Lower Culand Pit in what is now called the Grey Chalk Subgroup at Burham, Kent, in South East England. Pterosaur fossils had been discovered earlier in the same pit, including the front part of some jaws Bowerbank had used as the basis for the species Pterodactylus giganteus in 1846, as well as other bones. Based on the new snout, Bowerbank named the species Pterodactylus cuvieri; at this time, the genus Pterodactylus (originally named in 1815 based on a Bavarian specimen) was used for many pterosaur species now thought to be only distantly related to each other. The specific name honours the French palaeontologist Georges Cuvier, who had recognised that pterosaurs were flying reptiles. In full, the name can be translated as "Cuvier's wing finger".

The snout which Bowerbank made the holotype specimen (on which the scientific name is based) of P. cuvieri consists of the front of the upper jaw, including part of a premaxillary crest (a crest on the premaxilla, the frontmost bone of the upper jaw), and is catalogued today as NHMUK PV 39409 at the Natural History Museum in London. It was originally reported to preserve a single tooth in the first right tooth socket (at the front of the snout), but this had disappeared when the holotype was examined in the 2000s. Two complete teeth were also originally reported to be preserved in the same block of chalk as the snout. Bowerbank also believed some large bones in three other collections may either have belonged to the same species, to P. giganteus, or to a third possible species. The British biologist Richard Owen assigned one long bone to P. cuvieri in 1851 (today catalogued as NHMUK PV 41637) based on its size and the character of its surface, and identified it as a possible phalanx bone of the elongated wing-finger.

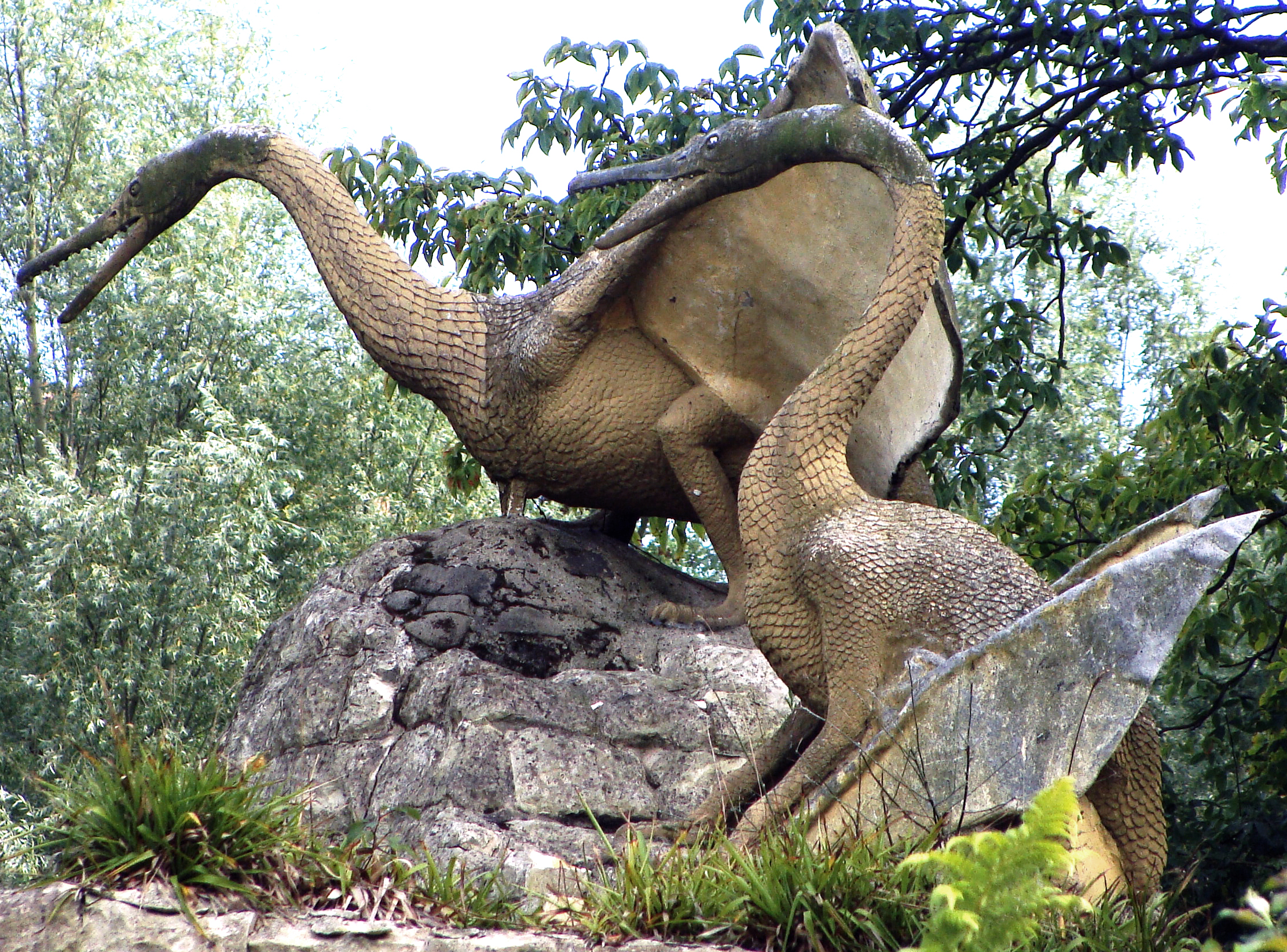
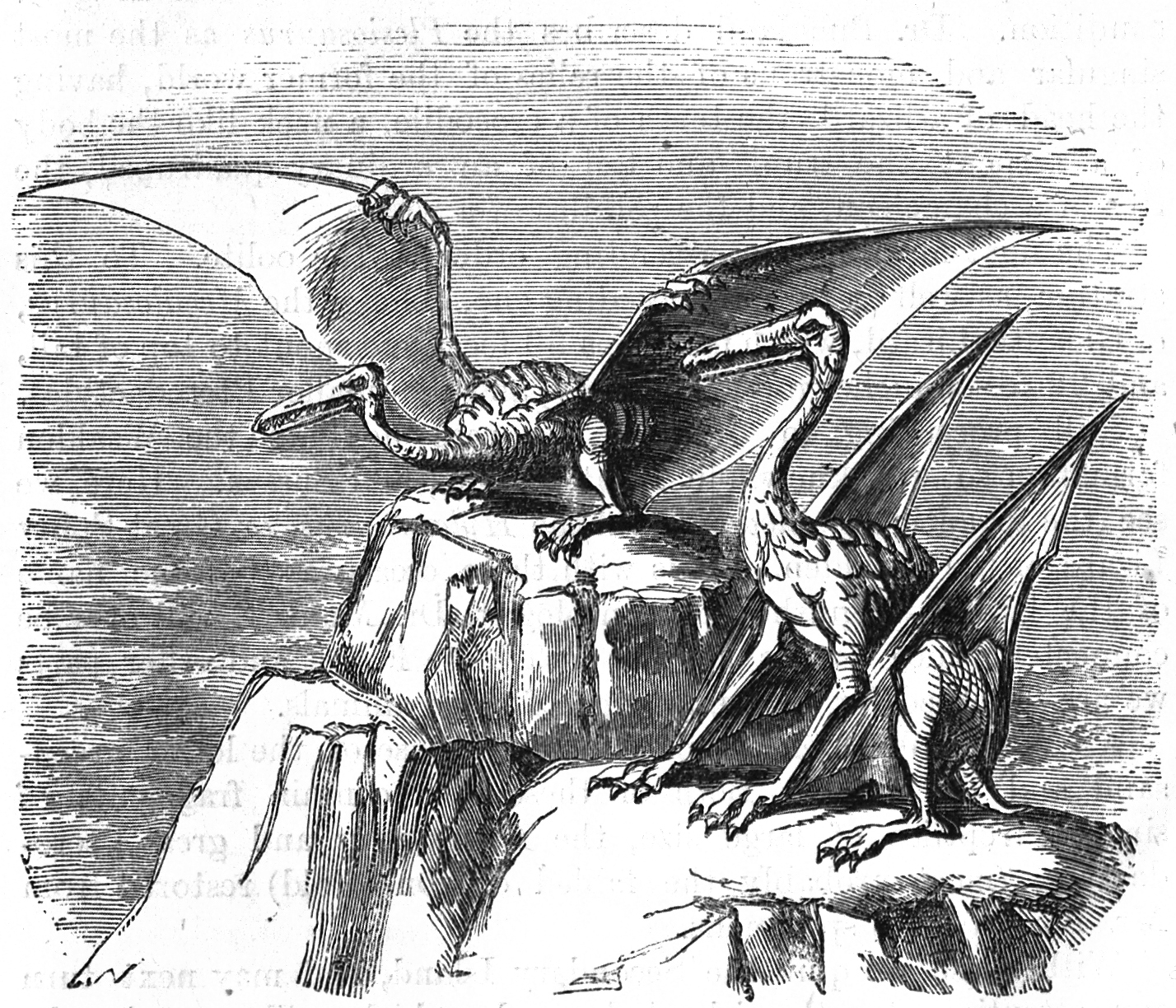
Two sculptures from the 1850s in Crystal Palace Park based on C. cuvieri, among the first sculptures to depict pterosaurs (left), and illustrations of same from the park's 1856 guidebook

In the 1850s the British artist Benjamin Waterhouse Hawkins created full-sized sculptures of prehistoric animals for Crystal Palace Park in London, under the supervision of Owen. Among them were two species of pterosaur, including two P. cuvieri sculptures made of iron-framed concrete and two smaller statues of Pterodactylus bucklandi. While Owen only identified one of the large sculptures as P. cuvieri in 1854, they are similar enough that they can be assumed to depict the same species. Hawkins' sculptures were the first to depict pterosaurs, and the oldest life reconstructions of giant members of the group. Incidentally, he thought these animals to be the original dragons, such as in the legend of Saint George. The larger P. cuvieri statues are today in disrepair due to their delicate nature and vandalism, and the smaller ones have been lost.

The British palaeontologist Mark Witton stated in 2019 that the anatomy of the sculptures was probably based on the (by then) more completely known P. antiquus. They were depicted with scales (though pterosaurs are now known to have had a hair-like covering, a feature already realised by some scientists at the time) and bird-like proportions such as small heads and large torsos, as was customary at the time. One sculpture is correctly shown in a quadrupedal pose, and with one foot flat on the ground. While this pterosaur was one of the first known preserved with a crest at the tip of the jaw, this feature is not included in the sculptures, as it seems they were assumed to have been more similar to those of P. antiquus. Witton and the British biologist Ellinor Michel said in 2023 that while it was the largest known pterosaur at the time, its historical significance was overshadowed by the 1870 discovery of the larger Pteranodon, a genus that was widely featured in text and artwork, while the Crystal Palace sculptures remained the only major publicity of P. antiquus.

In 1869, the British palaeontologist Harry Govier Seeley placed P. cuvieri in the new genus "Ptenodactylus" along with other English pterosaurs known mainly from upper jaws, in an index of specimens in the Woodwardian Museum. He noted these names were provisional, only intended for the convenience of students using the museum, and not necessarily as names for these species. In 1870, Seeley placed the species in the genus Ornithocheirus, which he had originally used for other species in his 1869 index, and figured a dentary bone (front bone of the mandible) he listed belonged to O. cuvieri. In 1874, Owen assigned the species to the genus Coloborhynchus. The British palaeontologist Reginald Walter Hooley used the name O. cuvieri in his 1914 revision of Ornithocheirus, using Seeley's terminology.

In 1922, the Austrian naturalist Gustav von Arthaber lamented that the scientific literature had accepted the many Ornithocheirus names that had only been mentioned in Seeley's catalogue for students. In his opinion names were of no use without an illustration of the specimens they were based on, or better still, a complete reconstruction of the relevant skeleton. For this reason, he provided a drawing of the skull of O. cuvieri (among other species), one of the few species for which the known jaw material proved its validity. In 1924, von Arthaber's interpretations were criticised by the Hungarian palaeontologist Franz Nopcsa von Felső-Szilvás, who found some of the skull reconstructions "worthless".

=== Discovery of more complete relatives and resulting interpretations ===
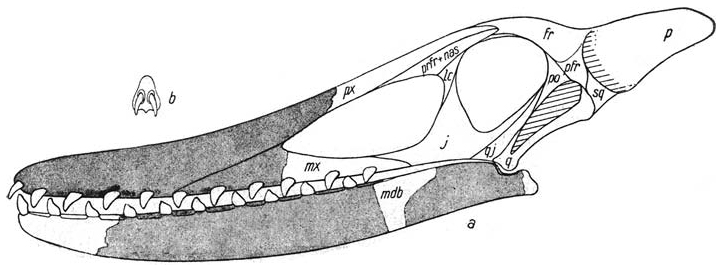
Von Arthaber's outdated 1919 skull reconstruction of C. cuvieri

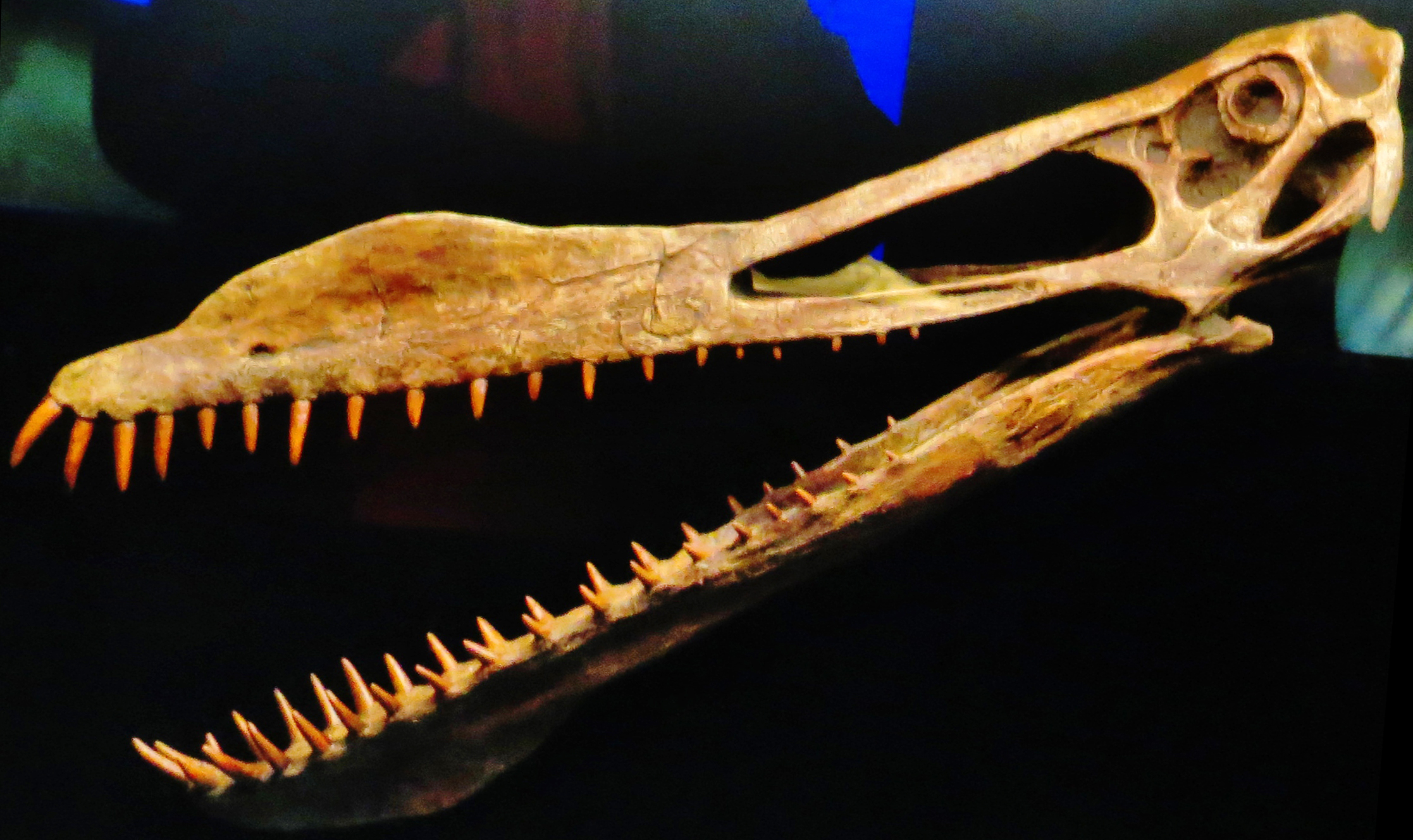
The discovery of more complete fossils of related pterosaurs from Brazil, such as Anhanguera (to which C. cuvieri was once assigned, skull shown), made the appearance of fragmentary English species clearer.

O. cuvieri and many other English pterosaurs were kept in the genus Ornithocheirus for most of the 20th century. In 1987, the German palaeontologist Peter Wellnhofer described the new crested pterosaur Tropeognathus from the Santana Formation of Brazil and noted the similarities between it and other newly described Brazilian taxa such as Anhanguera to English taxa that were based on fragmentary snouts, such as the various species assigned to Ornithocheirus. He concluded that while the appearance of the English taxa had long been a puzzle (leading for example to von Arthaber's unusual reconstructions), the discovery of the related and much better preserved and more complete Brazilian species made this clearer, showing that the English species too had premaxillary crests at the end of large, long skulls. When Anhanguera was described in 1985, it was thought to be the only pterosaur with such a crest known until that point (then referred to as a sagittal crest). In 1991, Wellnhofer stated that the genus Ornithocheirus had become a "wastebin" of species from different countries, assigned to it on the basis of insufficient characters, and needed clearer definition, and perhaps included several distinct genera.

The British palaeontologist S. Christopher Bennett stated in 1993 that the holotype specimen of O. cuvieri was the right first wing-phalanx bone mentioned by Owen in 1851, and cited him for the name without further explanation. In 1995, the Russian palaeontologist Natalia N. Bakhurina and the British palaeontologist David M. Unwin assigned a partial mandibular symphysis (the part connecting the two halves of the lower jaw) from Russia to cf. Anhanguera cuvieri (from Latin "confer", possibly belonging to this or a related animal), thereby using a new combination. Unwin and colleagues assigned pterosaur skeletal elements from the Toolebuc Formation of Australia to Anhanguera ?cuvieri in 2000. In 2001, Unwin also used the combination A. cuvieri, and cited Bowerbank for the name, with the snout as holotype. He assigned 23 jaw fragments from the Cambridge Greensand of England to A. cuvieri and considered it the most common pterosaur of that formation. Unwin concluded that the species O. brachyrhinus, O. colorhinus, O. dentatus, O. denticulatus, O. enchorhynchus, O. scaphorhynchus and O. xyphorhynchus were junior synonyms of A. cuvieri. He also considered a species originally named Pterodactylus fittoni by Owen in 1859 as a member of Anhanguera. In 2011, the Brazilian palaeontologist Alexander W. Kellner and colleagues made the Australian material that had been assigned to A. ?cuvieri the basis of a new genus, Aussiedraco, and stated that they saw no ground for placing O. cuvieri in Anhanguera.

=== New genus and assigned species ===
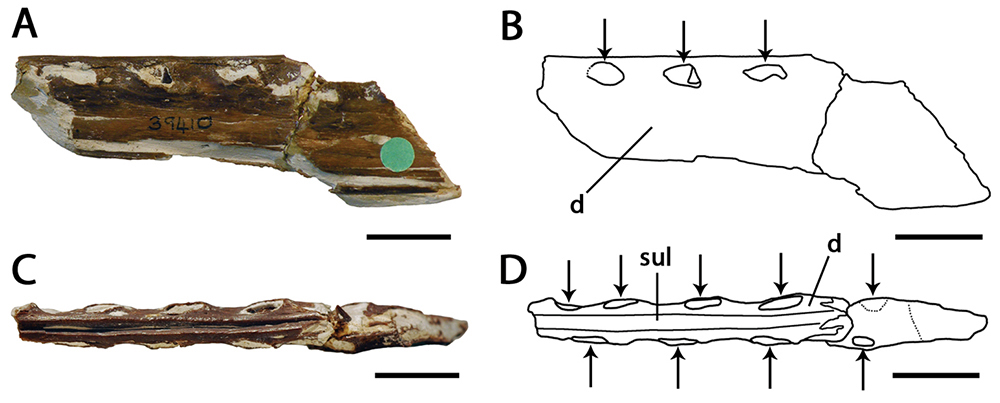
Type mandible fragment of Lonchodectes, which may be the same animal as C. cuvieri.

In 2013, the Brazilian palaeontologist Taissa Rodrigues and Kellner reviewed the species that had so far been placed in the genus Ornithocheirus (which they restricted to its type species, O. simus), as well as other English Cretaceous pterosaurs. They concluded that A. cuvieri differed enough from its relatives to be placed in a new, monotypic genus; Cimoliopterus. This generic name combines the Greek words Kimolia (Κιμωλία), which means "chalk", and pteron, (πτερόν) meaning "wing". In full, the name can be translated as "Cuvier's chalk wing". Rodrigues and Kellner also found that while the species P. fittoni, O. brachyrhinus, and O. enchorhynchus had various features in common with C. cuvieri, and could therefore not be excluded from that genus, they were too fragmentary to be assigned to it definitively and were considered nomina dubia (dubious names). They considered other species that were assigned to A. cuvieri by Unwin in 2001 dubious or belonging to other taxa. They also considered the Russian specimen assigned to cf. A. cuvieri in 1995 unrelated. In 2019, the Brazilian palaeontologist Rubi V. Pêgas and colleagues suggested that the type specimen of Lonchodectes (a dubious genus originally known as Pterodactylus compressirostris) represented by a partial mandibular symphysis from the Chalk Group, could represent the same species as C. cuvieri. They cautioned this is impossible to confirm until associated skull and mandible material is found.

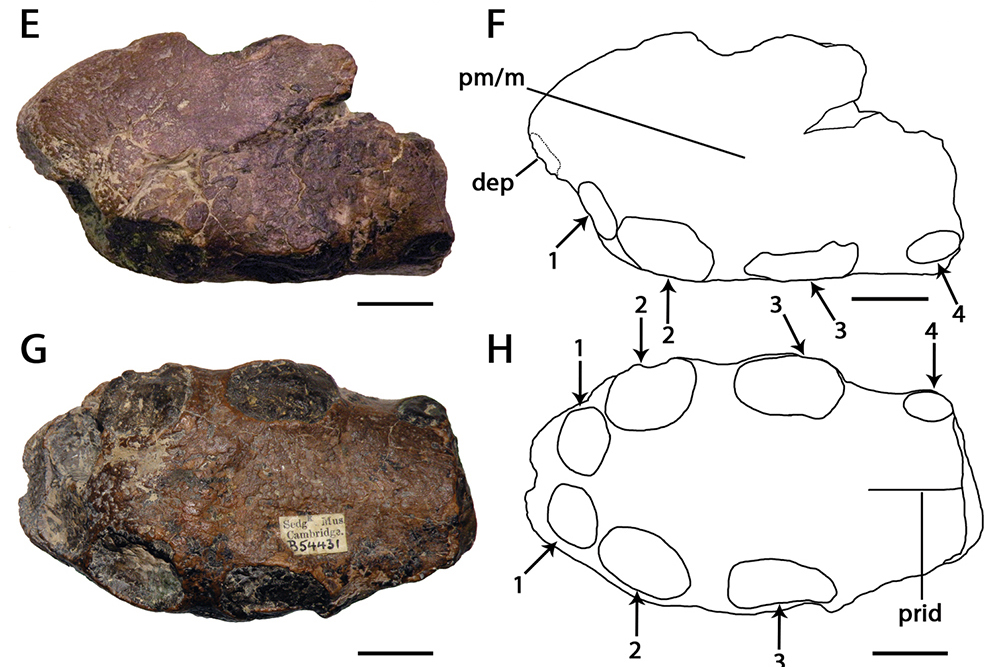
Syntype snout tip of Ornithocheirus colorhinus (once considered a large specimen of C. cuvieri), a species which was assigned to Cimoliopterus in 2025

In 2013, the American amateur fossil collector Brent Dunn discovered a pterosaur snout fragment in the Britton Formation near Lewisville Lake, northwest of Dallas, Texas, US. He donated the specimen to the Shuler Museum of Paleontology of Southern Methodist University, where it is catalogued as SMU 76892. In 2015, the American palaeontologist Timothy S. Myers described the specimen and made it the holotype of the new species Cimoliopterus dunni; the specific name honours Dunn, who died in 2013. The holotype specimen of C. dunni consists of the front part of a snout, including part of a premaxillary crest. The fossil was initially covered by a thin layer of red clay, which was prepared away. The three-dimensionally preserved fossil does not appear to have suffered the extreme crushing often seen in pterosaur fossils, though some of the hind part was distorted by compaction. C. dunni was only the third toothed pterosaur known from the Cretaceous of North America.

In 2025, Pêgas assigned O. colorhinus from the Cambridge Greensand to Cimoliopterus as the new combination C. colorhinus, due to finding it closely related to C. cuvieri. This species was originally named by Seeley in 1870, considered a synonym of C. cuvieri by Unwin in 2001, and was tentatively assigned to Camposipterus by Rodrigues and Kellner in 2013.

== Description ==
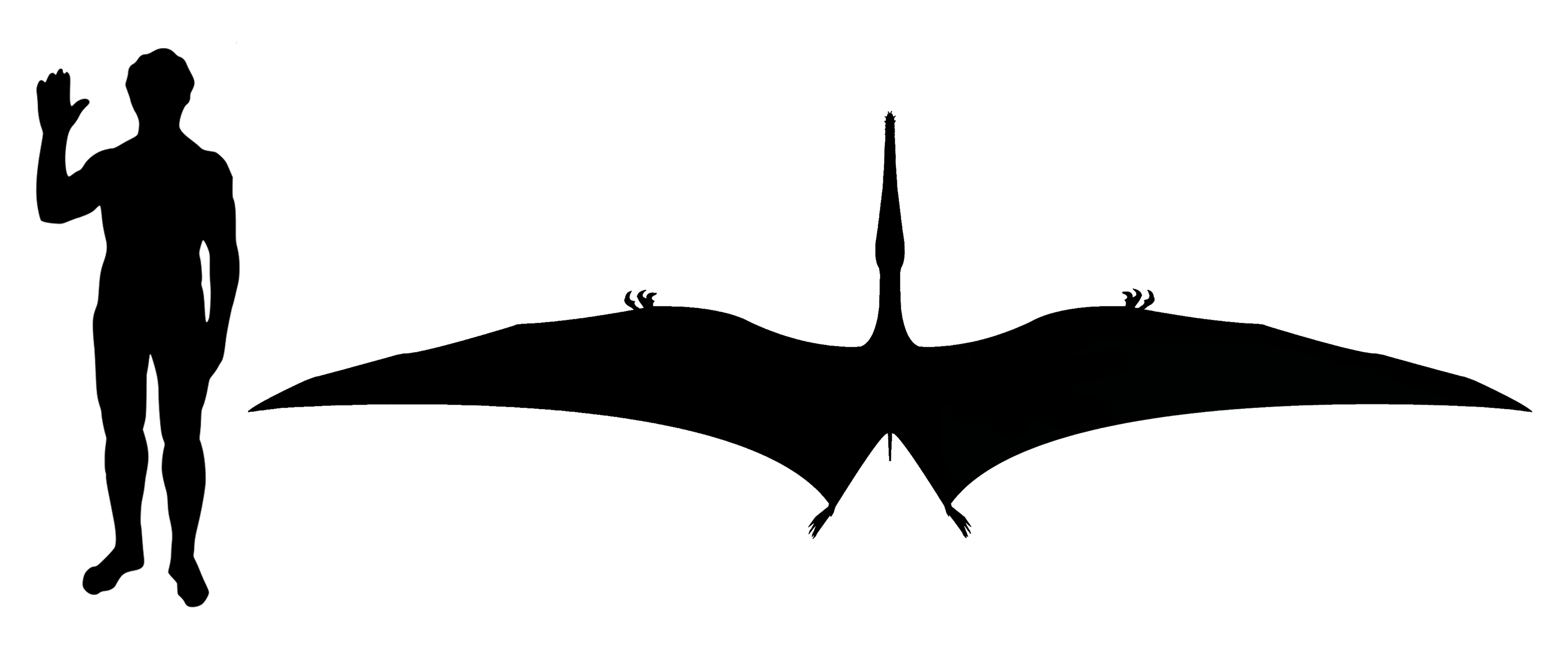
Approximate size of C. cuvieri compared to a human. C. dunni would have been of similar size.

Because the fossils are incomplete, the size of Cimoliopterus is difficult to estimate. Extrapolating from the remains of more complete pterosaur species, as well as various bones possibly belonging to C. cuvieri, Bowerbank estimated a wingspan of about 5.1 metres (16.6 ft) in 1851. This was larger than the estimates for the earlier named P. giganteus (now in the genus Lonchodraco), which he had considered "gigantic" for a pterosaur. Later the same year, Owen called C. cuvieri "truly gigantic", compared to P. giganteus, which he felt was therefore inaccurately named. In 2001, comparing the C. cuvieri holotype specimen with the more complete Anhanguera, Unwin estimated a wingspan of about 3.5 metres (11 ft). He estimated an assigned specimen, CAMSM B54.431 (originally a syntype snout tip of O. colorhinus, a species now considered part of Cimoliopterus), to have had a wingspan of up to 5 metres (16 ft). Witton and Michel gave a 4 metres (13 ft) wingspan for C. cuvieri in 2023, but cautioned it was "rough" due to the poor fossils. In 2015, Myers stated the holotypes of C. cuvieri and C. dunni belonged to individuals of a similar size. C. dunni would have been mid-sized for a pterosaur, with a wingspan of about 1.8 metres (6 ft), according to a press release accompanying its description. In 2019, Pêgas and colleagues refrained from estimating wingspans for such species represented by too fragmentary material.

More completely known related genera were fairly large pterosaurs, with proportionally large skulls, long jaws and tooth-rows, and often with large, rounded crests at the front of the jaws. The teeth at the front of the jaws were large and recurved, and further back the teeth were smaller, slightly recurved, and well-spaced. Much of the skeleton would have been pneumatised (filled with air sacs that lightened it). The necks were proportionally long, and the torsos relatively small. The forelimbs were proportionally enormous compared to the legs, with very long wing-fingers. As a pterosaur, Cimoliopterus would have been covered in pycnofibres (hair-like filaments), and had extensive wing-membranes, which were distended by the wing-fingers.

Rodrigues and Kellner provided a single diagnosis (a list of features distinguishing a taxon from its relatives) for the genus Cimoliopterus and species C. cuvieri in 2013, which Myers amended in 2015 when including C. dunni. The holotype snouts of the two Cimoliopterus species share features that distinguish them from other pterodactyloid (or short-tailed) pterosaurs such as a premaxillary crest that begins hindward on the snout and that the palatal ridge (which ran along the middle of the palate) extended forwards until the third tooth socket pair. In both species, the second and third tooth sockets are similar in size and larger than the fourth. The spacing between the sockets is irregular, with those towards the front being more closely spaced, and those towards the back more widely separated. There are three tooth sockets per 3 cm (1 in) of jaw margin towards the front of the jaw in C. dunni, while in C. cuvieri there are almost three sockets per 3 cm (1 in). However, towards the back of the jaw, there are two sockets every 3 cm (1 in) in both species. The palate is curved upwards. The snout tips of C. cuvieri and C. dunni are only expanded subtly from side to side, unlike the "spoon-like" expansions seen in many other toothed pteranodontoids, such as Anhanguera, Coloborhynchus, and Ornithocheirus. The subtle sideways expansion on the snout tip of Cimoliopterus results from the third pair of sockets being larger than the fourth pair, similar to what can be seen on the lower jaw of Aetodactylus. The subtle expansion is so weakly developed that it has been thought absent at times.

=== Cimoliopterus cuvieri ===
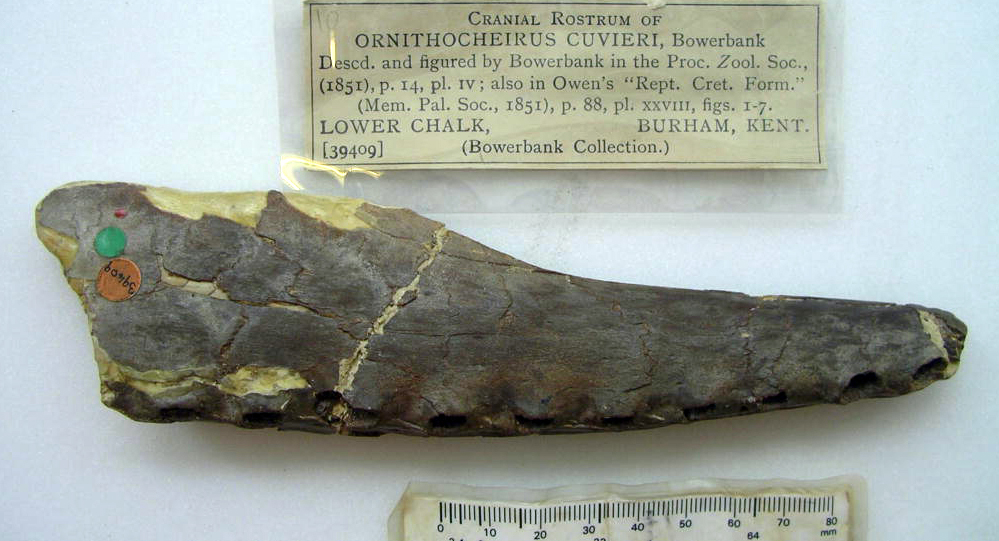
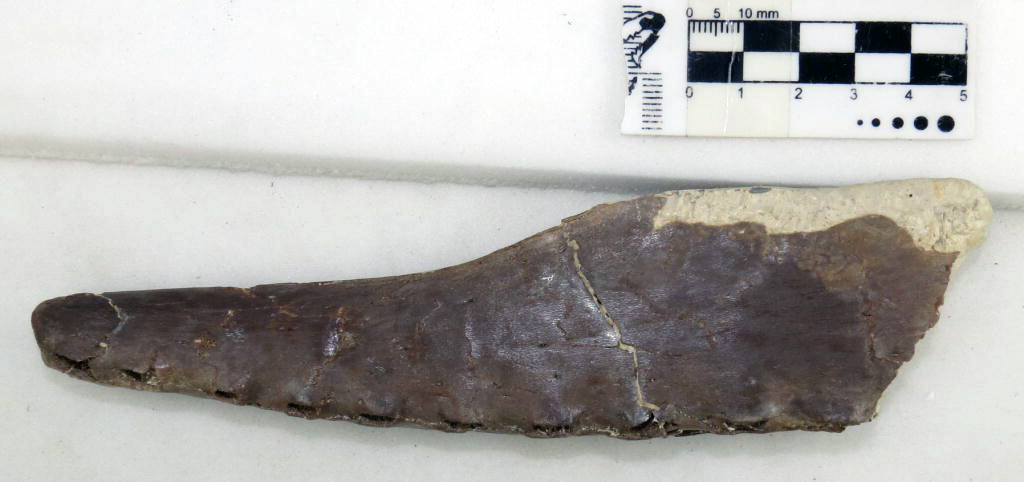
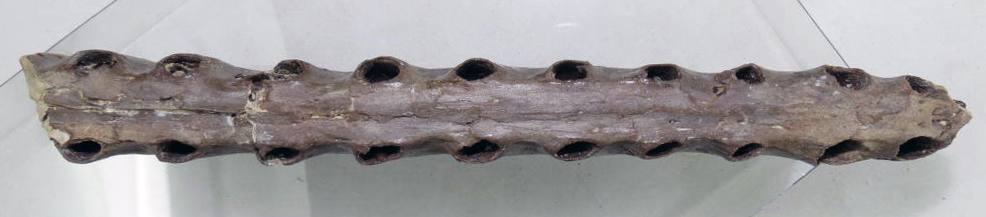
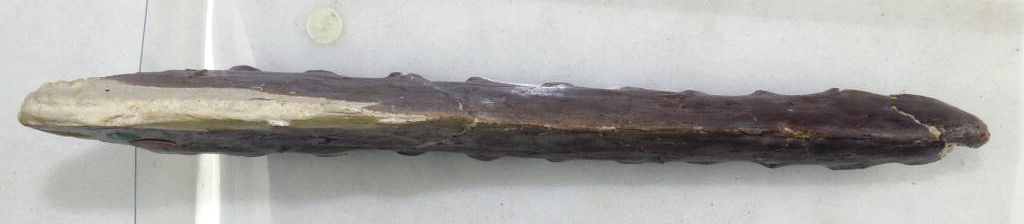
The C. cuvieri holotype snout in right (with old museum label), left, bottom, and top views

The holotype of C. cuvieri is composed of the front 18 cm (7 in) of the snout, represented mainly by the premaxillae, including the premaxillary crest. Eleven tooth sockets are preserved on each side. The preserved part of the snout is narrow. C. cuvieri is distinct in that the premaxillary crest is placed hindward on the snout by the seventh socket pair, but before the nasoantorbital fenestra (a large opening in front of the eye that combined the antorbital fenestra with the bony nostril). C. cuvieri has a low snout compared to Ornithocheirus and also possesses a forward-facing first pair of tooth sockets, unlike that genus. Furthermore, C. cuvieri can be distinguished from the genus Anhanguera because it lacks an expansion at the front of the snout, a feature otherwise present in the family Anhangueridae. C. cuvieri also does not have its fourth and fifth pair of tooth sockets smaller than its third and sixth, which is a key feature of Anhanguera.

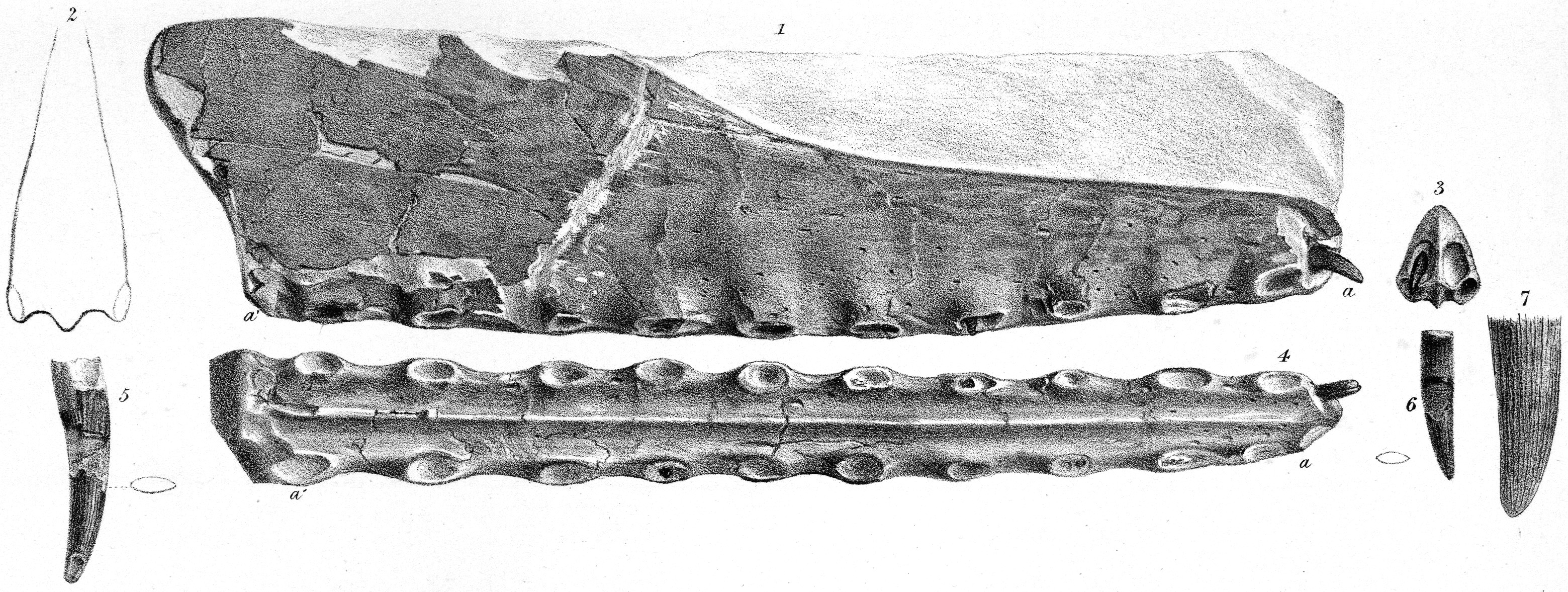
The C. cuvieri holotype as figured by Owen in 1851, with the now lost teeth (5–7), a cross-section of the hind part (2), and front view of the tip (3)

Bowerbank and Owen described and figured the now lost teeth found with the C. cuvieri holotype in 1851. The right of the two frontmost sockets contained a newly erupted (emerged through the gums) tooth, which protruded about one-third of an inch downwards and forwards at an oblique angle. The fifth socket on the right side and the eighth on the left contained budding teeth that did not protrude past the sockets, lying close to the inner walls of the sockets of the fully erupted teeth. The two fully developed displaced teeth were slightly curved, somewhat compressed, and their breadth gradually diminished from the open bases to their tips. The tips were broken off, revealing they were composed of compact, hard dentine, that was sheathed by a thin coat of enamel. Fine, longitudinal ridges (or striations) unequal in length, with wide intervals mark the enamel. The largest of the displaced teeth was longer than 3 cm (1.32 in), while the other was less than 3 cm (1 in), and was found near the third pair of tooth sockets.

Other pterosaur species have been considered similar to C. cuvieri, but most are too fragmentarily known to be unquestionably assigned to it or synonymised with it. For example, Pterodactylus fittoni shares with C. cuvieri a low snout tip, the lack of a front expansion at the end of the snout, a palate that is curved towards the back, as well as a palatal ridge extending hindward until the third pair of tooth sockets, though the latter feature is only shared with C. cuvieri if the first preserved pair of tooth sockets in P. fittoni is its second pair. The height of P. fittoni's snout can be differentiated from that of C. cuvieri, whose tip is also wider than high; the latter difference is possibly due to fracture, though, and the species cannot be unquestionably assigned. Another species, Ornithocheirus brachyrhinus, shares a number of features with C. cuvieri, including a curved palate, the front end being higher than wide, lack of a sideways expansion at the front of the snout and the lack of a crest at the front of the snout. The structure of O. brachyrhinus' snout tip fully resembles that of C. cuvieri, suggesting that O. brachyrhinus is assignable to this species. Even so, the holotype of O. brachyrhinus is fragmentary, and it is therefore impossible to conclude if it has a crest located towards the back, or if it has the size variation of tooth sockets that is distinct for C. cuvieri.

Other species that have been considered synonyms of C. cuvieri, like O. dentatus and O. enchorhynchus, differ with the former having smaller tooth sockets that are placed closer together. The latter, while quite similar to C. cuvieri (sharing features including the lack of a hindward positioned crest, the palate curving towards the back, the first tooth pair facing forward, as well as the lack of a front expansion), is fragmentary like O. brachyrhinus, which makes it hard to compare to other pterosaurs. O. scaphorhynchus has also been tentatively synonymised with C. cuvieri, but the incompleteness of this species makes it difficult to assign it clearly to any genus. The margins of the tooth sockets in O. scaphorhynchus are poorly preserved, but it is dissimilar to the spacing pattern present in C. cuvieri.

=== Cimoliopterus dunni ===
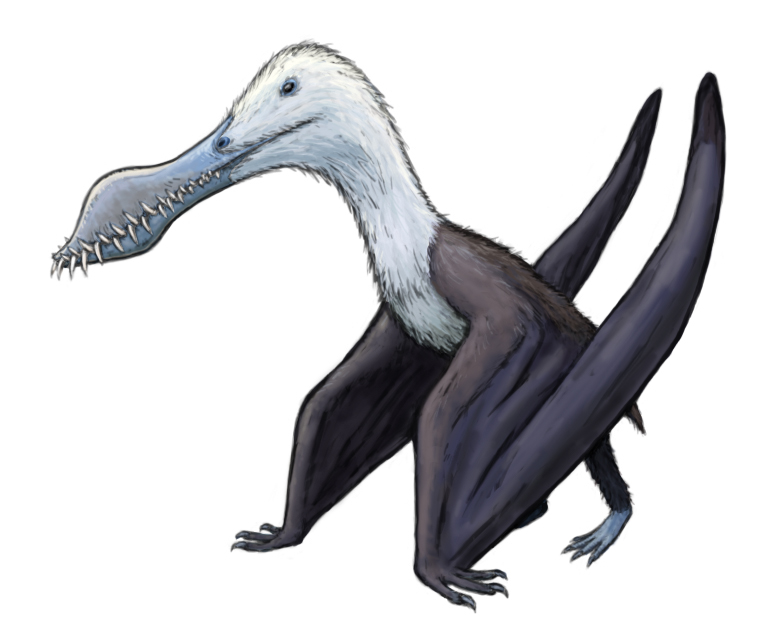
Life restoration of C. dunni in terrestrial pose

The holotype snout of C. dunni is composed of the front 18.5 cm (7.3 in) of the snout, comprising the premaxilla and maxilla (including a largely intact premaxillary crest), broken off just behind the 13th pair of tooth sockets. The cortical bone (the hard outer layer of bones) is well-preserved, though there are several regions where it is damaged or missing. The total number of tooth sockets preserved in the specimen is twenty-six. C. dunni is distinguished by the premaxillary crest beginning at the fourth socket pair, unlike that of C. cuvieri, and the crest is slightly upwards curved, forming a front edge that is concave. The crest is fused entirely to the jaw, which indicates the individual was not a juvenile. The upper edge of C. dunni's crest seems to descend moderately just before the broken portion, suggesting the crest was symmetrical from front to back when seen from the side. If the crest was symmetrical, the complete crest would have had a length of approximately 15 to 16 centimetres (5.9 to 6.3 in). The maximum height of the crest is 38 millimetres (1.5 in), which is above the ninth and tenth pair of tooth sockets. While crest-related features should be used with caution when identifying species, since they can be linked to growth stage or sexual dimorphism, the difference in crest-shape between C. dunni and C. cuvieri is probably unrelated to age, since the holotypes represent similarly sized individuals.

The tip of the snout in C. dunni is blunt. It is distinct in that the front surface of the jaw faces forwards and downwards, forming a 45° angle relative to the front part of the palate. Viewing the front end of C. dunni's snout from below the palate, it expands as it goes further back to a maximum width of 1.6 centimetres (0.63 in) above the third pair of tooth sockets. It suddenly narrows to a minimum width of 1.5 centimetres (0.59 in) at the level of the fourth pair of sockets. The width of the snout continues increasing hindward until it reaches a maximum of 1.8 to 1.9 centimetres (0.71 to 0.75 in) at the broken part of the hind edge of the crest. An angle of 8° relative to the flat area of the rear part of the palate is presumed to be based on its front portion being reflected towards the back. An inflection point (the point where the surface changes) close to the level of the eighth tooth sockets can also be seen.

C. dunni is distinct from C. cuvieri in that the first pair of tooth sockets is directed more downward than forward. The spaces between the tooth sockets measure a maximum of 11.5 millimetres (0.45 in) toward the front, and a minimum of 1.6 millimetres (0.063 in) towards the back. Since only a small replacement tooth is preserved in C. dunni, the texture of its teeth is unknown. While the crown (the part covered in enamel) of this tooth lacks striations, it is possible they appeared in more developed teeth. At less than 1 millimetre (0.04 in) high, a narrow palatal ridge extends towards the front from the broken portion on the rear end of the premaxillary crest.

=== Cimoliopterus colorhinus ===
C. colorhinus has a unique combination of traits that distinguishes it from relative. The frontal expansion of the snout is well-developed and lacks a marked constriction at its end; there is a depression above the first pair of tooth sockets; the depression above the first tooth socket pair faces behind and below, a unique trait of this species, the second and third tooth sockets are large; and the fourth tooth socket is much smaller than the second and third. It differs from C. cuvieri because that species lacks an expansion at the front of the rostrum and a depression aboive the first pair of tooth sockets. The depression above the first tooth pair is shared with Uktenadactylus wadleighi, but in this form the depression is horizontally oriented. Seeley speculated that it was the attachment area for lips, but Rodrigues and Kellner questioned this in 2013 because pterosaurs had horny beaks. Since all the specimens are incomplete, it is uncertain if this species had a crest.

== Classification ==
=== Early schemes ===
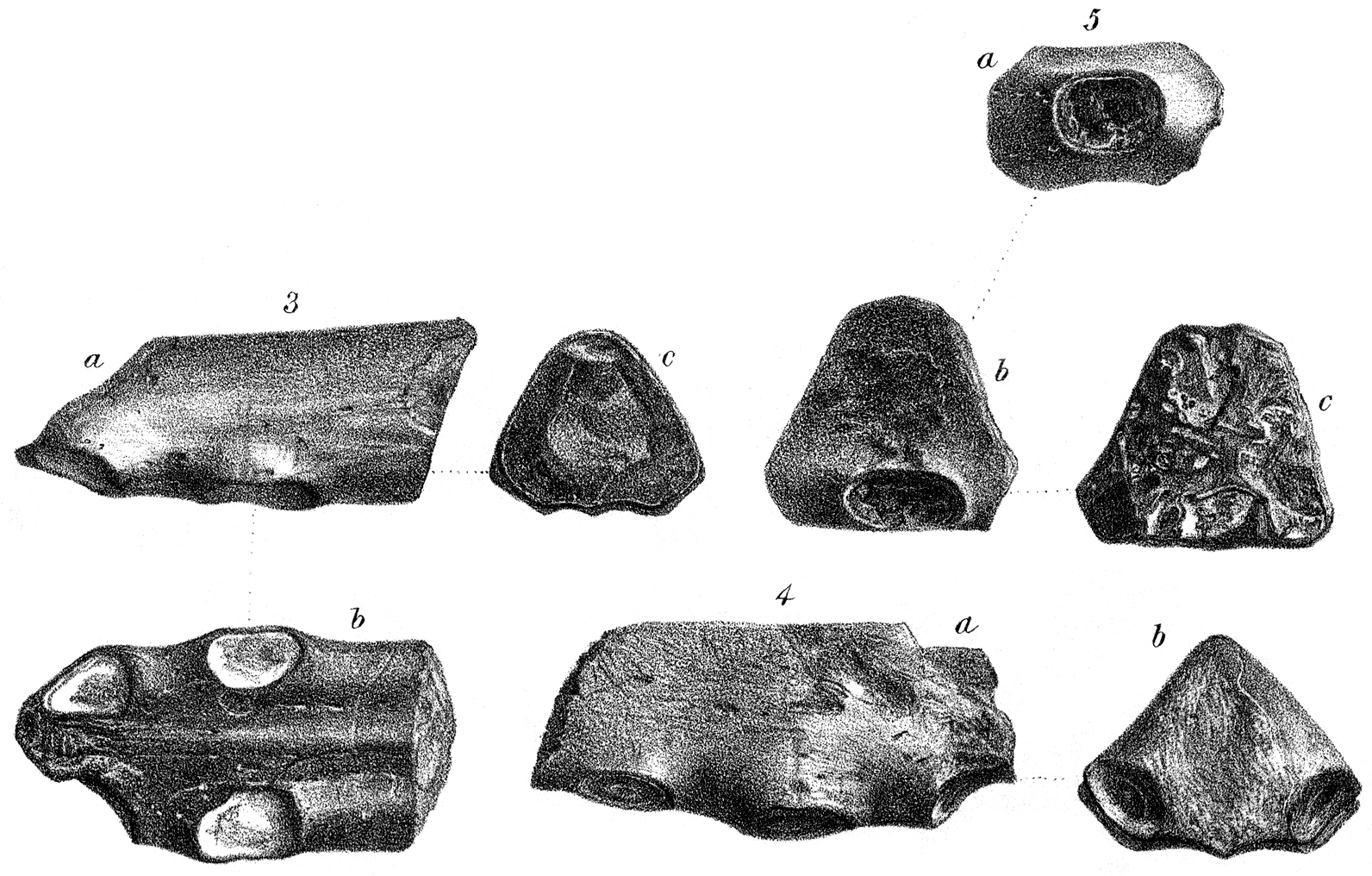
Lithograph of the P. fittoni holotype and assigned specimens; a dubious species considered close to C. cuvieri, and possibly the same

The taxonomic history of the type species of Cimoliopterus, C. cuvieri, is complicated, though English pterosaurs now known to have been close relatives were always considered similar to it. When it was first described, Bowerbank assigned C. cuvieri (then placed in Pterodactylus) to a "long-nosed species" group, along with the species Pterodactylus longirostris based on similar snout proportions. Later, Owen assigned P. cuvieri to Dentirostres, a group characterised by jaws containing teeth to their ends, a scleral ring (ring of bone that surrounds the eyes), their scapula (shoulder blade) and coracoid (hook-like structure in the shoulder) not being joined with one another, as well as having a short movable tail. P. cuvieri was classified in this group due to the extremity of its upper jaw, which was sufficient to demonstrate it had a pair of tooth sockets close to the end.

In 1870, Seeley assigned P. cuvieri (under the name Ornithocheirus cuvieri in his classification) to a group named Ornithocheirae, which consisted only of the genus Ornithocheirus, whose species were diagnosed as having teeth prolonged in front of the snout and a palate with a longitudinal (running lengthwise) ridge. In 1914, Hooley reviewed the genus Ornithocheirus and its taxonomy, dividing it into numbered groups with a designated generic (genus) name. Hooley followed Seeley in classifying P. cuvieri as a species of Ornithocheirus, also assigning the species O. colorhinus and O. nasutus (now considered species of Camposipterus), as well as the species O. brachyrhinus, O. dentatus, O. denticulatus, O. enchorhynchus, O. fittoni, and O. oxyrhinus, in addition to the species O. sedgwicki (now considered the type species of Aerodraco, or alternatively a species of Camposipterus) and O. polyodon as well. Hooley named this group "Group No. 1" and designated the genus name Ornithocheirus for it. He later assigned this genus to a subfamily called Ornithocheirinae, which was within a family called Ornithocheiridae. All the species in the genus Ornithocheirus were diagnosed as having sideways compressed beaks, with the tip more or less obtuse (with an angle over 90°), their palate being curved slightly upward and facing backward (which caused their front teeth to point directly forward), and having a longitudinal ridge on the palate. Their teeth were nearly circular and the margins of their tooth sockets rose above the palate.

=== 21st century schemes ===
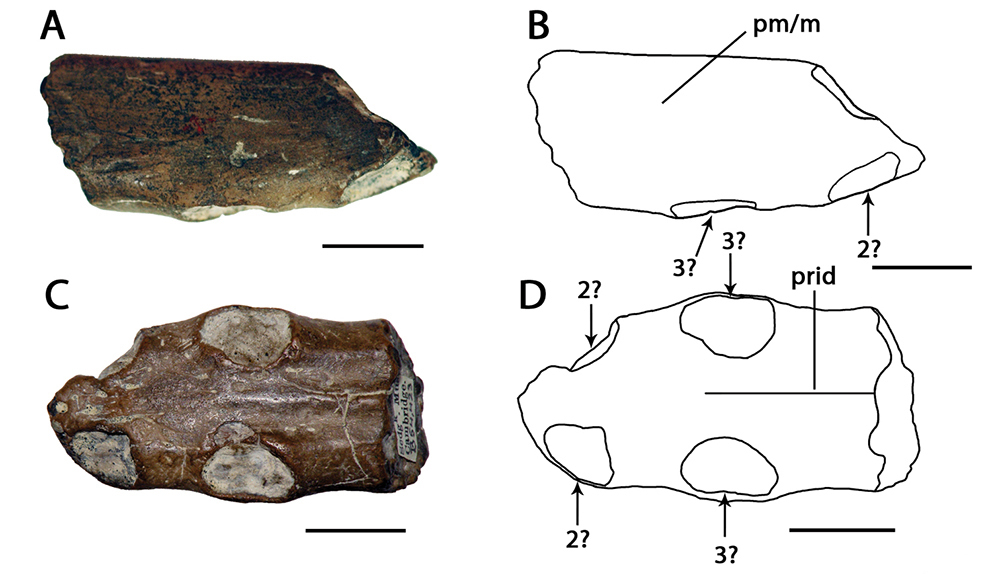
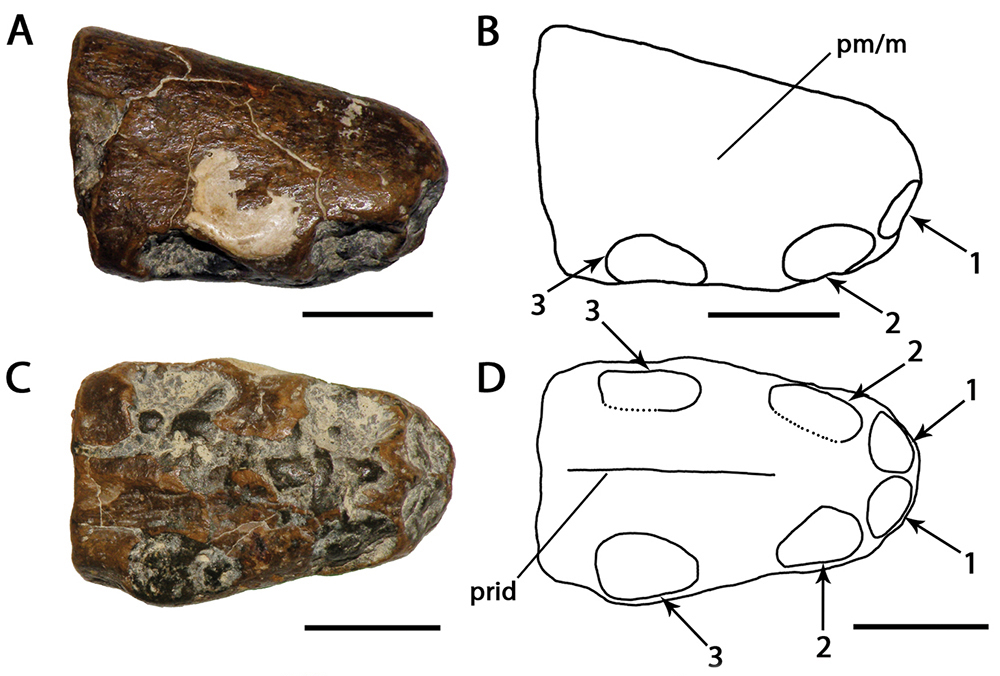
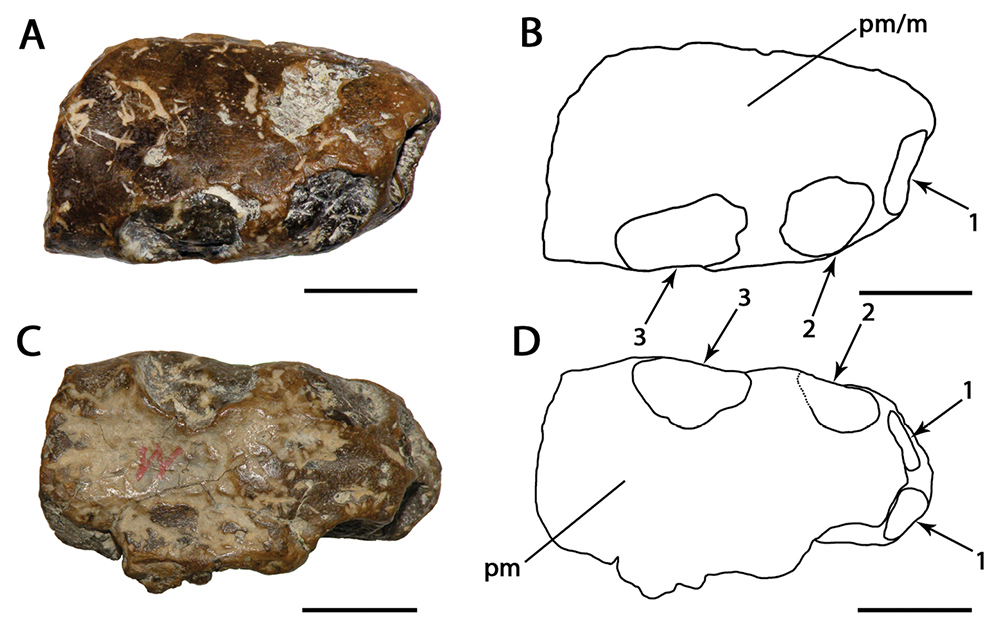
Holotype snout tips of P. fittoni, O. brachyrhinus, and O. enchorhynchus; these dubious species are similar to C. cuvieri but too fragmentary to assign.

In 2001, Unwin considered A. cuvieri a member of Ornithocheiridae, along with many of the English and Brazilian Cretaceous species, and suggested that some pterosaur species from these countries belonged to the same genera, such as Anhanguera, Ornithocheirus and Coloborhynchus. In 2013, Witton described the state of ornithocheirid classification as infamously controversial and confused, with competing schemes used by different groups of palaeontologists. One group used the term Ornithocheiridae, whereas another used Anhagueridae, and there was no agreement on the number of genera and species. In its description by Rodrigues and Kellner in 2013, Cimoliopterus, which consisted only of C. cuvieri, was assigned to the group Pteranodontoidea, though in an uncertain position (incertae sedis), with it and "Ornithocheirus" polyodon forming a sister group to the newly named clade Anhangueria. They could not confirm that Ornithocheiridae was a monophyletic (natural) group, and restricted it to include Ornithocheirus simus alone. In 2014, in a phylogenetic analysis (the study of the evolutionary development of a species or a group) conducted by Chinese palaeontologist Xiaolin Wang and colleagues, Cimoliopterus was found to have been closely related to the pterosaur Ikrandraco, which at the time, along with the pterosaurs belonging to the Anhangueria, were the only ones known to have had blade-like crests on their jaws.

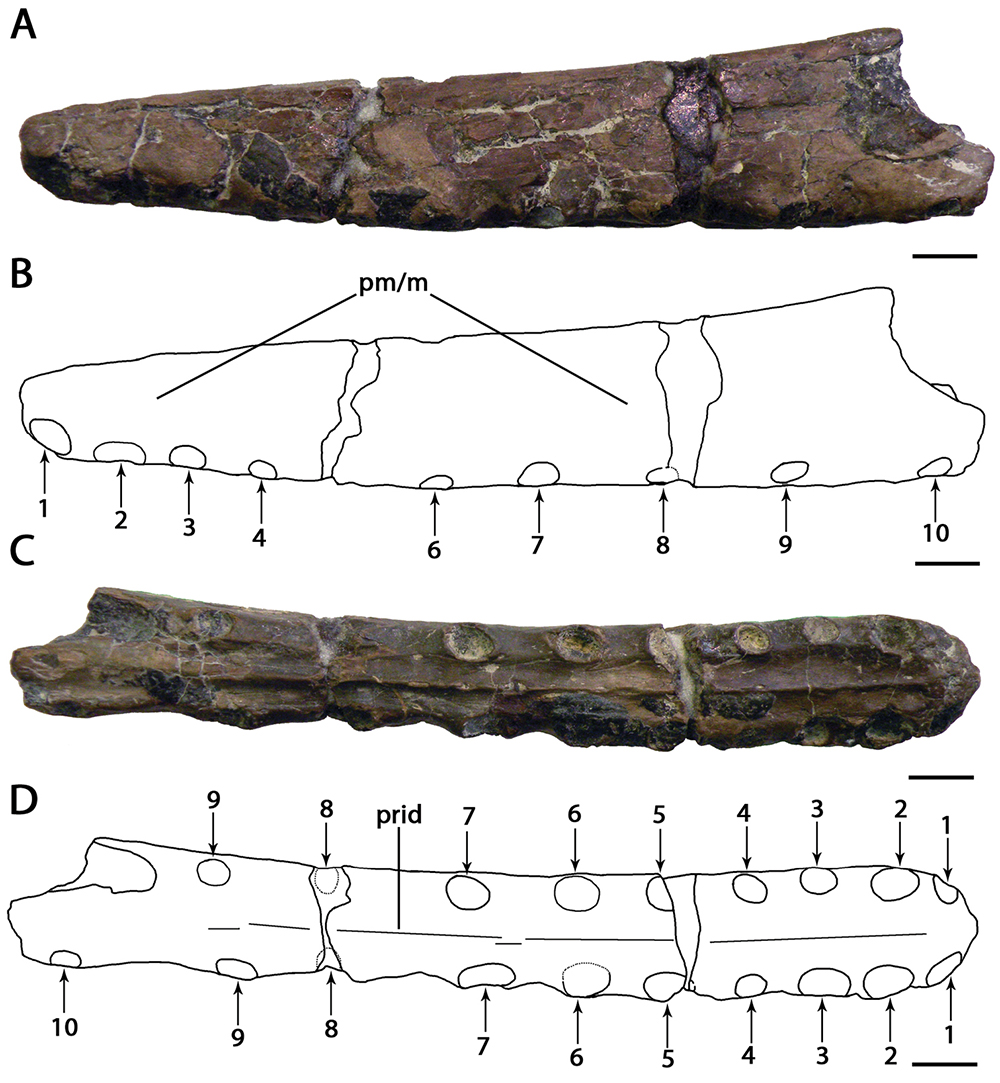
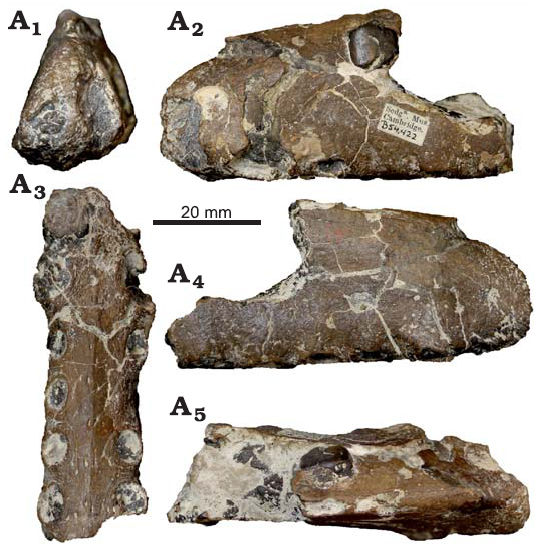
Snout tips of the related Camposipterus nasutus (left) and Aerodraco sedgwickii (right), related species described from fragmentary English specimens in the 19th century which were also moved to new genera in the 21st century.

In his description of C. dunni, Myers used a modified version of the data set of an older phylogenetic analysis that he conducted with Brian Andres in 2013. The arrangement of the resulting cladograms ("family trees" showing interrelationships) depended on how the uncertain tooth texture of C. dunni was interpreted; if it was coded as "ambiguous", C. dunni became the sister taxon to a clade composed of C. cuvieri and Aetodactylus halli, and if it was coded as striated, C. dunni became the sister taxon of C. cuvieri, with A. halli as the sister taxon to that clade. In turn, this clade is the sister taxon to a clade composed of the species Cearadactylus atrox, Brasileodactylus araripensis, Ludodactylus sibbicki, as well as the families Ornithocheiridae and Anhangueridae, all of which are members of the group Pteranodontoidea. Although Myers found Aetodactylus to be closely related to Cimoliopterus, differences in jaw morphology and orientation and spacing of the tooth sockets indicate they are distinct from each other. Due to the similarities in the jaw form as well as the dentition of both C. dunni and C. cuvieri, and clear differences from Aetodactylus in these features, Cimoliopterus is unlikely to be a paraphyletic (unnatural) group according to Myers.

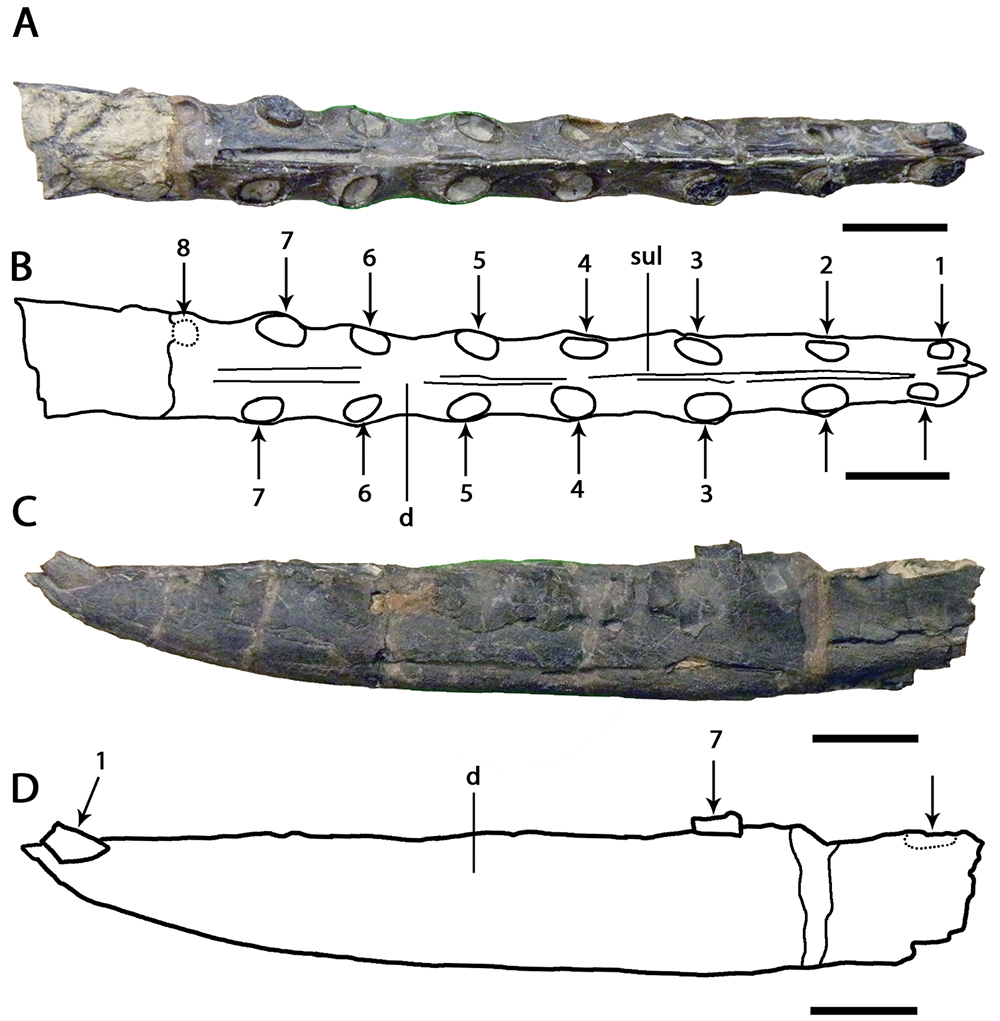
Holotype mandible fragments of Targaryendraco (top) and Aussiedraco (bottom, once assigned to A. ?cuvieri), two genera from the clade Targaryendraconia, of which Cimoliopterus is a possible member

In 2018, a phylogenetic analysis conducted by Nicholas Longrich and colleagues also recovered Aetodactylus and Cimoliopterus as sister taxa, reinforcing their close relationship. In 2019, the British palaeontologist Megan Jacobs and colleagues performed a phylogenetic analysis where they placed both C. cuvieri and C. dunni within the family Ornithocheiridae, as the sister taxon of Camposipterus nasutus. In turn, their clade forms a polytomy (an unresolved group) along with the species Camposipterus colorhinus and C. sedgwickii. This close relationship of C. cuvieri and Camposipterus was already recovered by Hooley in 1914 and by Unwin in 2001, though as species of Ornithocheirus and Anhanguera, respectively. Also in 2019, Borja Holgado and colleagues recovered a clade consisting of Cimoliopterus and the Anhangueria, this clade being defined by a palate that is deflected towards the back. Ornithocheirus was recovered as the sister taxon to this clade, and in turn, all of them were placed within the group Ornithocheirae.

Later in 2019, Pêgas and colleagues redescribed the species Ornithocheirus wiedenrothi as Targaryendraco, and named the new group Targaryendraconia, wherein Cimoliopterus was included. Some of the most notable characteristics of this group include the slenderness of the jaws, the front end of the dentary symphysis being particularly compressed sideways compared to other lanceodontians (the wider group to which they belong), its total width equaling about three times the tooth's socket width, as well as the subparallel lateral outline of the margins of the front half of both jaws in occlusal view (view from below the teeth). Pêgas and colleagues found Cimoliopterus, Camposipterus, and Aetodactylus to form a group which they named Cimoliopteridae. This group is supported by several synapomorphies (shared derived traits). Cimoliopterus and Camposipterus share the feature of having the first three pairs of upper tooth sockets closer to one another than the posterior ones, with the third one closer to the second one than to the fourth, the same pattern is seen in Aetodactylus but in its lower jaws instead of the upper ones. Further shared features between Cimoliopterus and Camposipterus include the presence of a palatal ridge that extends towards the front until the level between the third and second pair of tooth sockets as well as the location of the widest portion of the front part of the snout, which is at the third pair of tooth sockets. The cladogram of the phylogenetic analysis by Pêgas and colleagues is presented below on the right, showing the position of Cimoliopterus within Cimoliopteridae, while the other targaryendraconians, Aussiedraco, Barbosania and Targaryendraco, were grouped in Targaryendraconidae.

Cladogram 1: Jacobs and colleagues, 2019.

- Ornithocheirae
  - Anhangueridae
  - Ornithocheiridae
    - - Coloborhynchus clavirostris
      - - Uktenadactylus wadleighi
        - - Coloborhynchus reedi
          - Coloborhynchus capito
          - - Coloborhynchus fluviferox
            - Coloborhynchus NHMUK R481
    - - - Siroccopteryx moroccensis
        - - Ornithocheirus simus
          - Tropeognathus mesembrinus
      - - Camposipterus segwickii
        - Camposipterus colorhinus
        - - Camposipterus nasutus
          - - Cimoliopterus cuvieri
            - Cimoliopterus dunni

Cladogram 2: Pêgas and colleagues, 2019.

- Ornithocheirae
  - Ornithocheirus simus
  - - Targaryendraconia
      - Targaryendraconidae
        - Aussiedraco molnari
        - Barbosania gracilirostris
        - Targaryendraco wiedenrothi
      - Cimoliopteridae
        - Aetodactylus halli
        - Camposipterus nasutus
        - - Cimoliopterus cuvieri
          - Cimoliopterus dunni
    - Anhangueria
      - Hamipteridae
        - Hamipterus tianshanensis
        - Iberodactylus andreui
      - Anhangueridae
        - Tropeognathus mesembrinus
        - Coloborhynchinae
        - Anhanguerinae

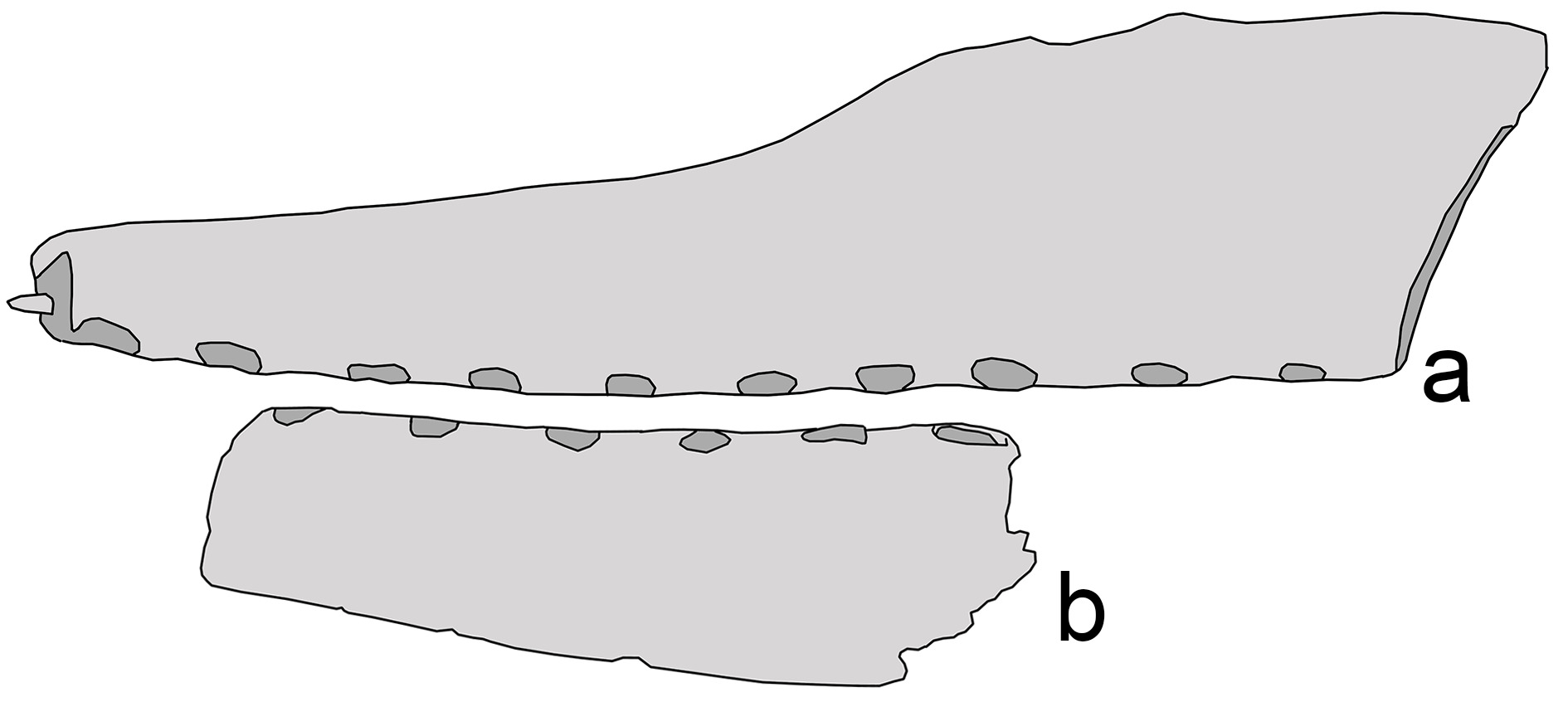
Snout of C. cuvieri paired with the dentary bone of the related Saratovia

A 2022 phylogenetic analysis by Rudah Ruano C. Duque and colleagues also confirmed the validity of Cimoliopteridae. Contrastingly, a 2025 study by Alexander Averianov reconfirmed the existence of Targaryedraconia and its inclusion of Cimoliopterus, it failed to recover Cimoliopteridae. Instead, Aetodactylus and Camposipterus formed a grouping that was in an unresolved polytomy with the two species of Cimoliopterus and the newly named Saratovia. Averianov noted that the slightly upturned dentary of Saratovia corresponded well with the snout of C. cuvieri, and that these parts would have been similar, but concluded that the two did not belong to the same genus because Cimoliopterus had a palatal ridge which would indicate the presence of a median groove on the mandibular symphysis, which Saratovia lacked. He stated that Cimoliopteridae was distinguished by traits of the upper jaw, whereas the putative sister grouping Targaryendraconidae was distinguished by those of the lower jaw. Given this, he found it unsurprising the grouping was not stable.

Pêgas supported the validity of Cimoliopteridae in 2025, listing common traits such as a "nose-like" protrusion at the front of the rostrum above the first tooth sockets and the front end of the palatal ridge reaching between the second and third pair of tooth sockets. The cladogram below shows the internal relationships of Ornithocheiriformes including Targaryendraconia, according to Pêgas, 2025:

- Ornithocheiriformes
  - - Ornithocheiridae
      - Thapunngaka shawi
      - - Ornithocheirus simus
        - FSAC-KK 5025
          (Kem Kem beds, O. cf. simus)
  - - Anhangueroidea
      - Targaryendraconia
        - Targaryendraconidae
          - Targaryendraco wiedenrothi
          - - Barbosania gracilirostris
            - Aussiedraco molnari
        - Cimoliopteridae
          - - Camposipterus nasutus
            - Aetodactylus halli
          - - Cimoliopterus dunni
            - - Cimoliopterus colorhinus
              - Cimoliopterus cuvieri
      - Anhangueria
        ⊞
        - Hamipteridae
          - Iberodactylus
          - Hamipterus
        - Anhangueridae
          - Tropeognathinae
            - Tropeognathus
            - - - Haliskia
                - Ferrodraco
              - - Aerodraco
                - - Akharhynchus
                  - Siroccopteryx
          - - Coloborhynchinae
              - Coloborhynchus
              - - Uktenadactylus spp.
                - Nicorhynchus spp.
            - Anhanguerinae
              - - Caulkicephalus
                - - Guidraco
                  - Ludodactylus
              - - Liaoningopterus
                - - - Brasileodactylus
                    - Maaradactylus
                  - Anhanguera spp.
        ⊟

=== Evolution ===
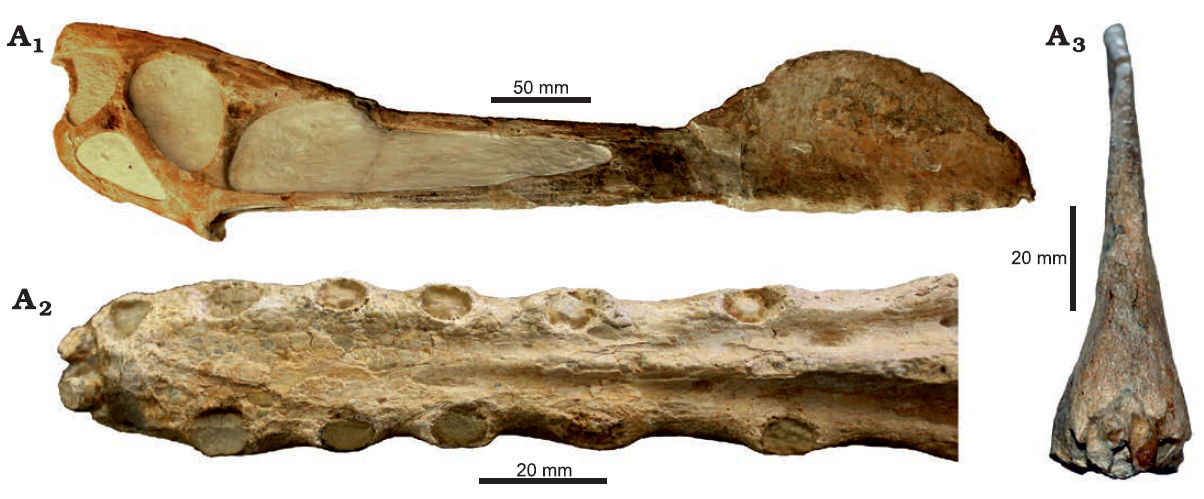
Skull of the more completely known relative Tropeognathus from Brazil; note that the crest begins at the tip of the snout, unlike in Cimoliopterus.

Unwin stated in 2001 that the Cambridge Greensand and what is now the Grey Chalk Subgroup provided some of the youngest records of ornithocheirids, with A. cuvieri being the youngest known member of the group. Due to the more hindward positioned premaxillary crest of Cimoliopterus, unlike those seen in anhanguerids, Rodrigues and Kellner suggested in 2013 that their crests could have evolved independently from each other. In 2015, Myers stated that the discovery of C. dunni in North America extended the distribution of the genus Cimoliopterus, showing that the pterosaur faunas of Europe and North America were similar by the mid-Cretaceous despite the ongoing widening of the North Atlantic Ocean. That pterosaurs retained palaeobiogeographical (geographical distribution of prehistoric animal groups) affinities by the mid-Cretaceous was also supported by other related pterosaurs identified in North America, Europe and northern Africa, such as Coloborhynchus and Uktenadactylus.

Myers elaborated in a press release that the population ancestral to C. dunni and C. cuvieri was able to move between North America and England until about 94 million years ago, as the similarity between the two species indicated that there had been little time between their divergence. As the Atlantic opened up the supercontinent Pangaea, populations of animals became isolated from each other, and diverged evolutionarily, but this pattern would have been more complicated with pterosaurs because they could fly across water bodies. Myers did not suggest the presence of a land bridge between the continents, but that the sea level fluctuated over time, and pterosaurs could have island-hopped between the land masses that emerged between. However, it still remained a mystery why no close ties had been identified between pterosaurs of North and South America, indicating there could have been a barrier to their dispersal.

In 2019, Pêgas and colleagues agreed with Rodrigues and Kellner that the crest of Cimoliopterus had evolved independently from those of anhanguerians, since closer related targaryendraconian taxa, such as Barbosania, Camposipterus, and Aetodactylus, did not possess crests. According to their analysis, since Cimoliopterus was more closely related to Targaryendraco (of Hauterivian age), Aussiedraco (of Albian age) and Barbosania (also Albian) than to anhanguerians, this would help fill a temporal gap that would otherwise result in a ghost-lineage leading to Cimoliopterus going back to the Valanginian age. Pêgas and colleagues thought the slight sideways expansion in the jaws of Aetodactylus and Cimoliopterus differed from the rosette-like condition seen in the jaws of anhanguerians, and that it was unclear if the condition in the former group was a precursor stage to that of the latter, with this issue needing further investigation. They concluded that the recognition of the clade Targaryendraconia showed the Cimoliopterus-lineage was a diverse and cosmopolitan sister-group of Anhangueria, with the two having a similar stratigraphic distribution. Witton and Michel noted in 2023 that Cimoliopterus has the distinction of being among the last toothed pterosaurs.

== Palaeobiology ==
=== Feeding ===
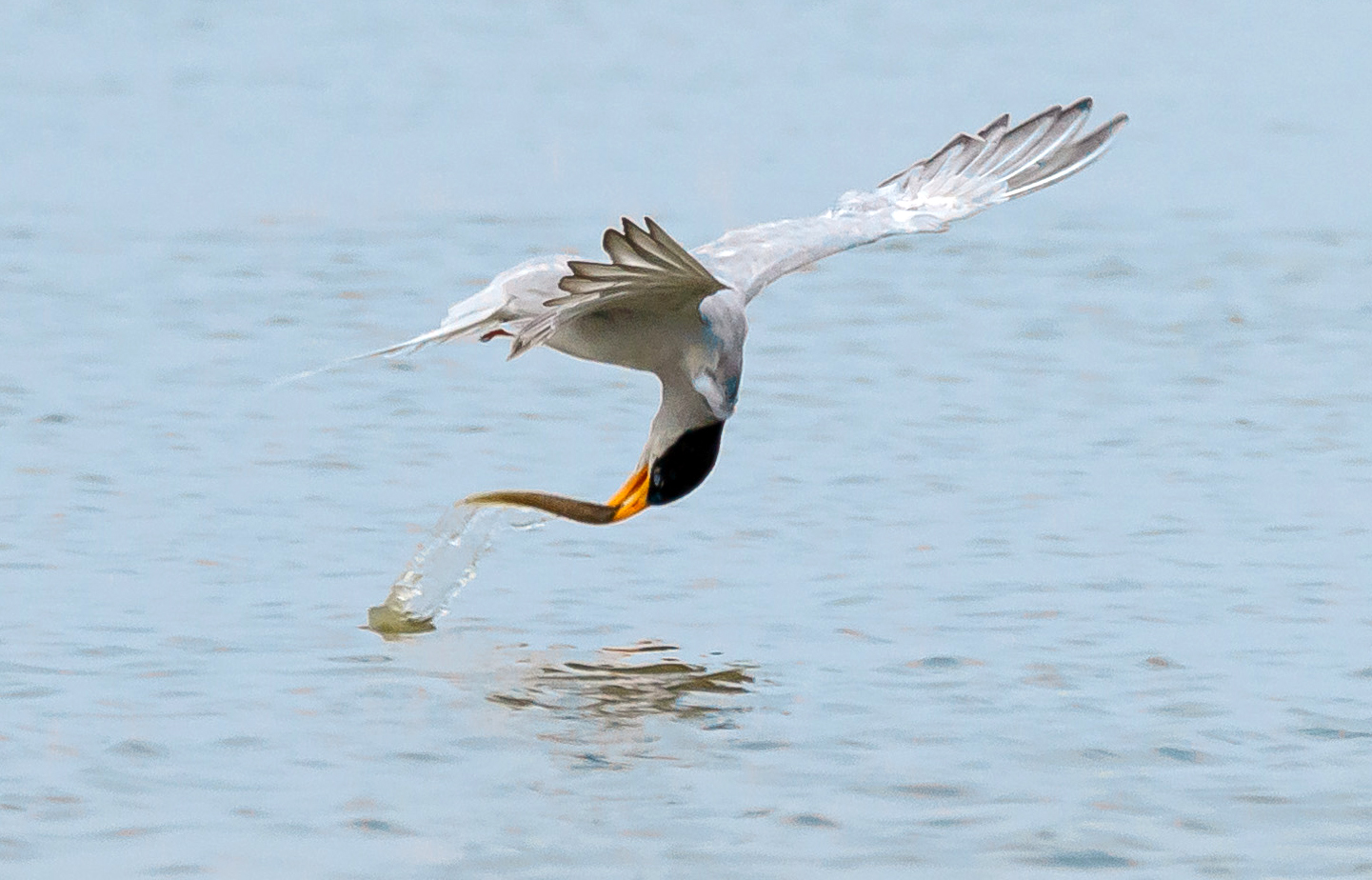
A river tern catching a fish while flying, in the manner suggested for pterosaurs similar to Cimoliopterus.

In 1987, Wellnhofer stated that while the crests of pterosaurs such as Pteranodon and Dsungaripterus were probably used as aerodynamic rudders or as areas for muscle attachment, the crests on the front ends of the jaws of Tropeognathus and its relatives could not serve this purpose. He proposed instead that these crests could have functioned as the keel of a boat, to stabilise the jaws in water while skimming and catching fish with the jaws submerged at high speed. The shape of the keel would reduce flow-resistance, keeping the head in a stable position, and would therefore have a hydrodynamic rather than aerodynamic function. In 1991, he elaborated they would have fished while flying just above the water, by thrusting the long head rapidly forward, dipping it in the water, and seizing prey with their pointed jaws.

André J. Veldmeijer and colleagues pointed out in 2006 that apart from ornithocheirids usually being found in deposits associated with water, their interlocking teeth also supported piscivory (fish-eating), being built for spearing slippery prey rather than cutting or slashing. The long, curved front teeth would be suited for catching slippery prey such as fish, and the smaller teeth at the back of the jaws ensured food was held and transported down the throat. The frontal position of the eyes and some adaptations to the brain may have been related to accurately evaluating the position of a fish before entering the water. They also pointed out that the differences in crest position, size of the palatinal ridge, and the presence or absence of a front expansion of the jaw, made it hard to believe they all obtained food in the same way, but that this did not rule out some overlap.

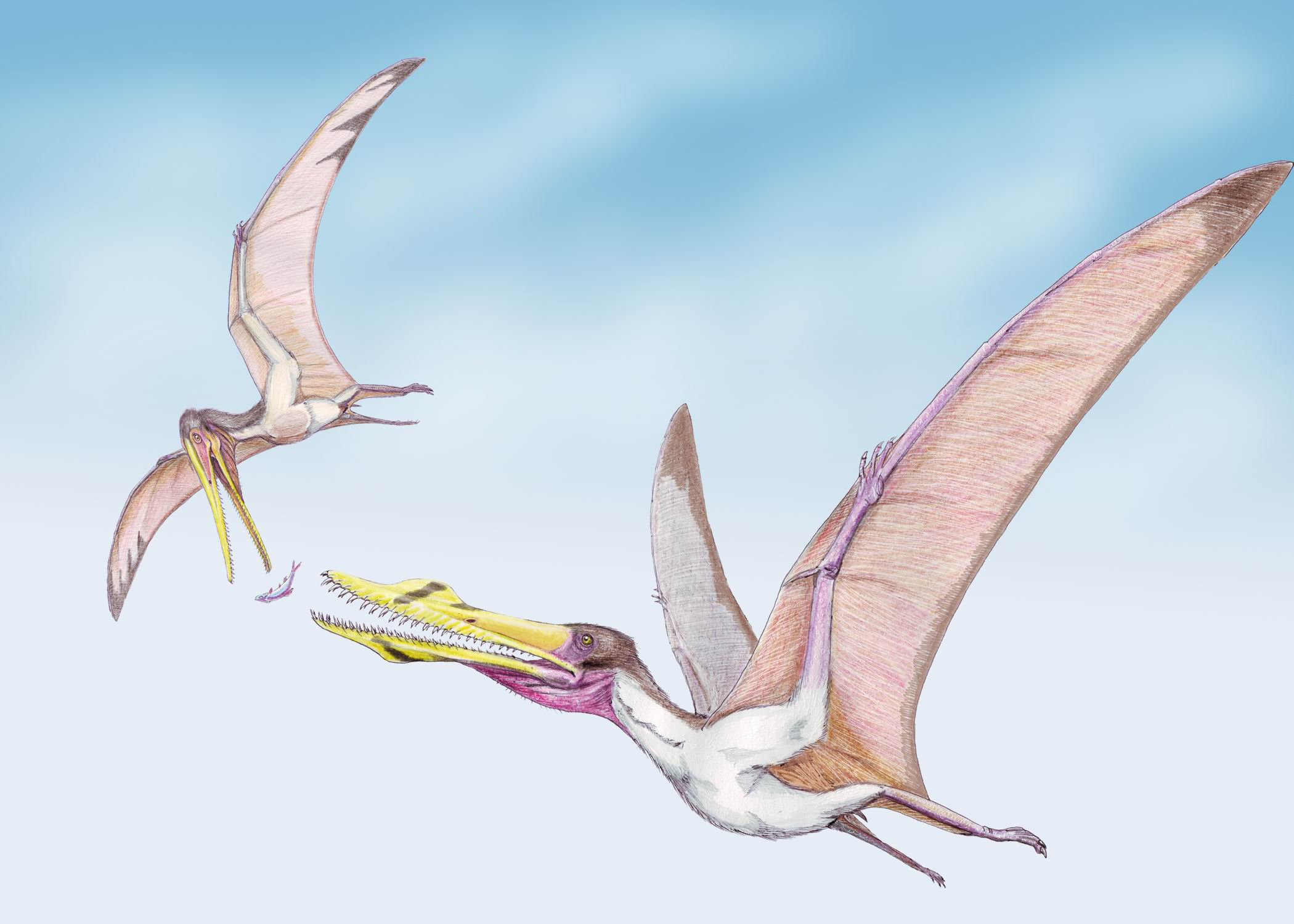
Restoration showing C. cuvieri (right, depicted with a throat pouch) stealing prey from Lonchodectes

Veldmeijer and colleagues noted that since the bodies of these pterosaurs were small, they would not have had space for large fish, and such fish may also have altered their flight capability, as is the case for bats. They may have hunted small fish or pre-digested them before swallowing (since their teeth were not adapted for chewing), but the second option would have required cheeks or throat pouches to keep prey inside the mouth; the latter has been reported in some pterosaurs. They ruled out skimming as a feeding method, since they believed it would cause problems for flying stability if a wing tip touched the water surface. The authors supported Wellnhofer's fish-snatching hypothesis by testing a geometrical model based on the skull and neck of Anhanguera, and suggested it would have approached the water with its head parallel to the surface, turned it down while extending the neck forwards to reach the slower moving fish, while the crest helped maintain stability by counteracting the force of the water. They concluded that the premaxillary crests were probably for minimising water attrition, and therefore not for sexual display. They were unable to determine what the consequences were of Anhanguera having a more hindward placed crest than Coloborhynchus and Ornithocheirus.

Witton stated in 2012 that ornithocheirids showed adaptations for feeding without landing, with teeth of varying size that protruded from the jaw from many angles. Only using the front teeth to grab prey helped distance the body from the water's surface, minimising the chance of crashing. In 2013, Witton noted the skim-feeding hypothesis for ornithocheirids had been questioned, but that dip-feeding (as seen among terns and frigatebirds) was supported by various features, like their elongated snouts, well-suited for reaching swimming animals, as well as their "fish-grab" tooth arrangement. Witton doubted the idea that the premaxillary crests were used to stabilise jaw tips when being plunged into water for food, since some ornithocheirids lacked such crests completely, and modern dip-feeders can achieve the same without similar structures. The diversity of tooth-morphology in ornithocheirids indicates that feeding methods other than dip-feeding were also employed by members of the group, such as reaching for food while on the water's surface or diving shallowly under the surface. Instead of being used for stabilisation during skimming or flight, Witton considered the crests of pterosaurs to have been display structures, as the crests are thought to have been sexually dimorphic in some species. In 2022, Duque and colleagues reported a crestless Anhanguera specimen, which they argued was evidence for the crests being linked to growth development or sexual dimorphism.

=== Locomotion ===
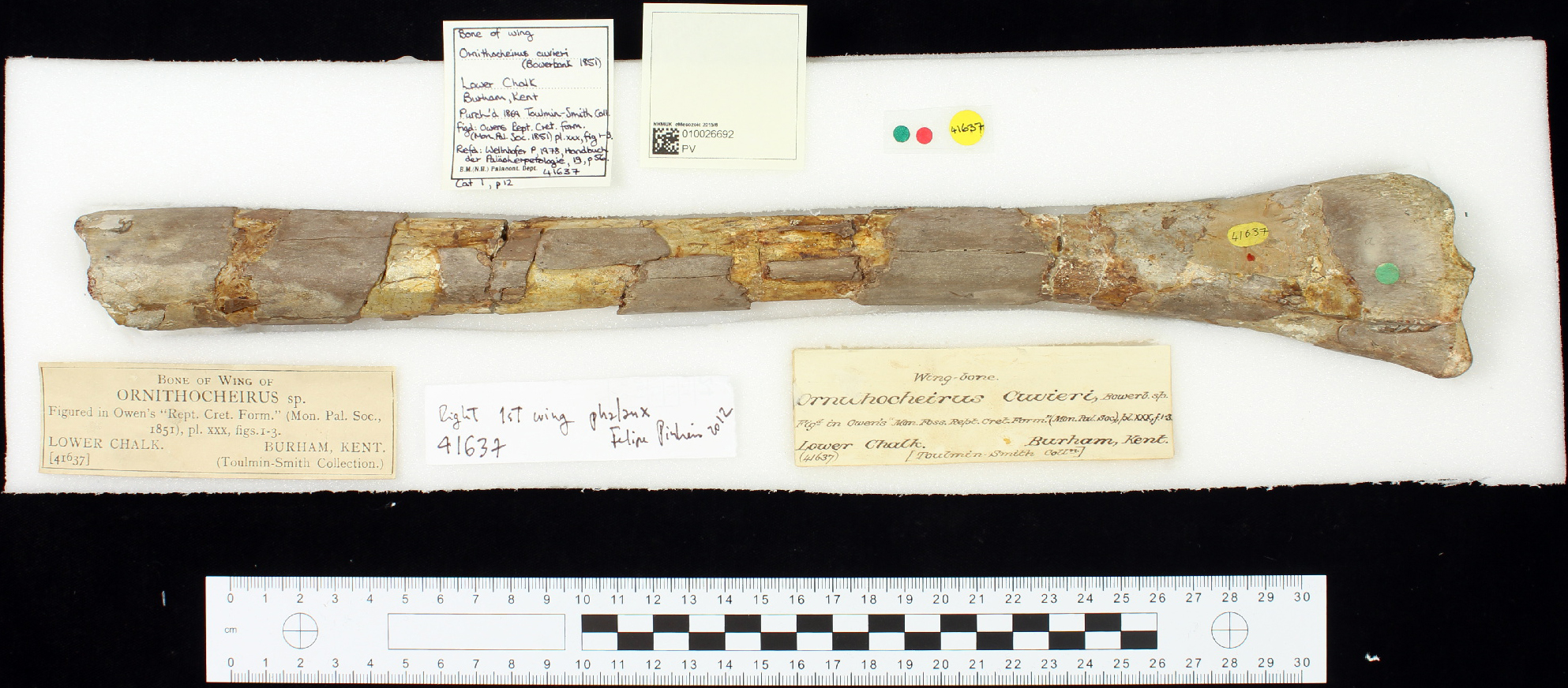
A wing-finger bone assigned to C. cuvieri, used in a study to reconstruct pterosaur flight-abilities.

Witton summarised ideas of ornithocheirid locomotor abilities in 2013 and stated that features such as small legs but large wings, low body masses for their wing-spans, wings with high aspect ratios, and reduced wing-loading indicates they preferred life in the air and were adapted for long-distance soaring. Since their wing-shapes were similar to those of oceanic seabirds, they were probably better adapted for oceanic soaring than soaring over terrestrial areas, which is supported by their fossils being found mainly in marine deposits. They were possibly able to take off from water, which would be helped by their small torsos and legs. Their terrestrial locomotion was probably limited by their short legs, and they may have been restricted to slower shuffling walks (so that the long forelimbs did not outpace the hindlimbs) and faster bounding, which indicates they may have spent limited time on the ground. As has been hypothesised for pterosaurs in general, they probably took flight by launching quadrupedally, and they were possibly able to swim fairly well to be able to take off from water surfaces.

In 2017, the British biologist Colin Palmer used CT scans of ornithocheirid pterosaur wing-bones, including the wing phalanx that had been assigned to C. cuvieri, to reconstruct the wing spar (the main structural element) of pterosaur wing-membranes. He used the bending strength of the wing spar of a structural model with a 6-metre (20 ft) wing span based on the CT scans to infer the likely tension of the wing membrane needed to suppress aeroelastic flutter (instability caused by air resistance) at high flight speeds, and minimising ballooning, thus preventing structural failure of the membrane under flight loads. The three estimates were of similar magnitude, implying the membrane would have high-modulus material (Young's modulus, tensile elasticity), which supports the idea that the actinofibril layer (structural fibres inside the wings of pterosaurs) on the outside of the membrane which reinforced pterosaur wings were of keratinous material (the same material in human hair and nails), and differed greatly from the membranes of bats.

== Palaeoenvironment ==
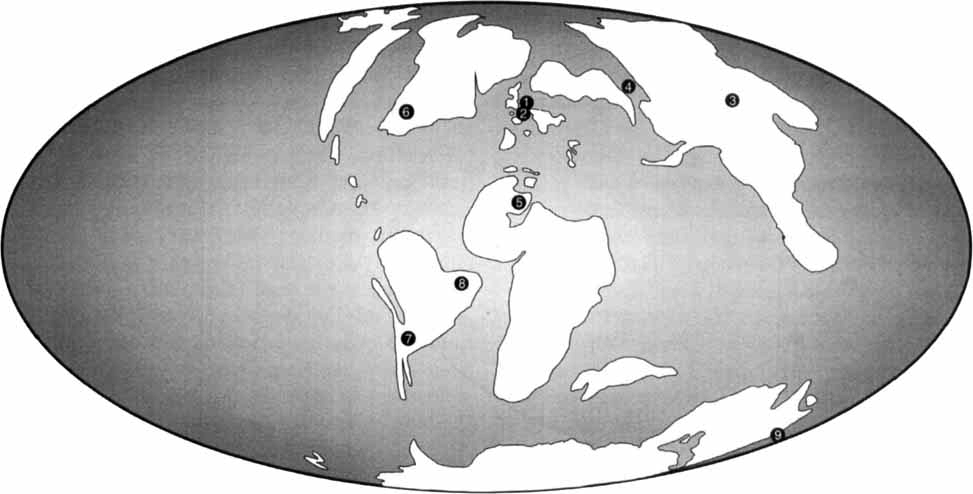
Palaeobiogeographic map of Cretaceous pterosaur assemblages; 1 is the Cambridge Greensand where C. colorhinus was found, 2 is the Grey Chalk Subgroup where C. cuvieri was found, 6 shows Texas, where C. dunni was found.

The holotype of C. cuvieri was found in Kent, England, collected in chalks and marls of the Grey Chalk Subgroup, which dates to the Cenomanian-Turonian ages of the Upper Cretaceous, though the precise stratigraphic position of the specimen is unknown. The Grey Chalk Subgroup has also been known historically as the Lower Chalk Formation or Chalk Marl, and is now considered a member within the Chalk Group, which has itself also been known as the Chalk Formation. The Grey Chalk Subgroup consists of shallow marine deposits, composed of clayey or marley chalk without flint, and has been geologically dated based on biostratigraphic zones defined by the presence of the ammonites Mantelliceras mantelli and Calycoceras guerangeri (index fossils used to date layers). Other animals known from the Grey Chalk Subgroup include pterosaurs such as Lonchodraco and many dubious species, and dinosaurs like the indeterminate nodosaurid Acanthopholis and the hadrosauroid "Iguanodon" hilli.

The holotype of C. dunni was found in the Britton Formation of north-central Texas, which dates to the Cenomanian stage of the early Late Cretaceous. The formation is part of the Upper Cretaceous Eagle Ford Group, which dates to the middle Cenomanian to late Turonian ages (96–90 million years ago). The specimen was preserved in a layer of grey marine shale with iron-oxide concretions, and found in the Sciponoceras gracile ammonite zone, situated in the upper–middle part of the Britton Formation, which dates to the late Cenomanian, approximately 94 million years ago. Abundant fossil remains of ammonites and crustaceans are contained in the dark grey shales in which C. dunni was found, which is consistent with having been deposited in marine shelf environments that were low in energy and poorly oxygenated. The area it was found in would have been off shore in the shallow Western Interior Seaway, which covered the central part of the US and Canada. Other animals of the Britton Formation include decapods, ammonites, fish (including sharks), plesiosaurs, turtles, and coniasaurs. Coprolites (fossil faeces) attributed to fish are also known.

== See also ==
- List of pterosaur genera
- Timeline of pterosaur research
