= Ptenodactylus =

Ptenodactylus is a scientific name which has been used for several distinct genera of animals. It may refer to:

- Ptenodactylus (Gray, 1845): A junior synonym of the lizard genus Pristidactylus
- "Ptenodactylus" (Seeley, 1869): A nomen nudum which in the 19th century was used to refer to at least 21 species of pterosaur including:
  - "Ptenodactylus" brachyrhinus: A synonym of Ornithocheirus brachyrhinus (nomen dubium)
  - "Ptenodactylus" capito: A synonym of Ornithocheirus capito
  - "Ptenodactylus" colorhinus: A synonym of Camposipterus colorhinus.
  - "Ptenodactylus" crassidens: A synonym of Ornithocheirus crassidens. (nomen dubium)
  - "Ptenodactylus" cuvieri: A synonym of Cimoliopterus cuvieri.
  - "Ptenodactylus" dentatus: A synonym of Ornithocheirus dentatus. (nomen dubium)
  - "Ptenodactylus" enchorhynchus: A synonym of Ornithocheirus enchorhynchus (nomen dubium)
  - "Ptenodactylus" eurygnathus: A synonym of Ornithocheirus eurygnathus. (nomen dubium)
  - "Ptenodactylus" fittoni: A synonym of Pterodactylus fittoni (nomen dubium)
  - "Ptenodactylus" machaerorhynchus: A synonym of Lonchodraco machaerorhynchus
  - "Ptenodactylus macrorhinus": A nomen nudum
  - "Ptenodactylus" microdon: A synonym of Lonchodraco microdon
  - "Ptenodactylus" nasutus: A synonym of Camposipterus nasutus
  - "Ptenodactylus" oweni: A synonym of Lonchodraco microdon
  - "Ptenodactylus" oxyrhinus: A synonym of Ornithocheirus oxyrhinus (nomen dubium)
  - "Ptenodactylus" platystomus: A synonym of Ornithocheirus platystomus.
  - "Ptenodactylus" polyodon: A synonym of Ornithocheirus polyodon
  - "Ptenodactylus" scaphorhynchus: A synonym of Ornithocheirus scaphorhynchus. (nomen dubium)
  - "Ptenodactylus" sedgwicki: A synonym of Camposipterus sedgwickii.
  - "Ptenodactylus" tenuirostris: A synonym of Ornithocheirus tenuirostris (nomen dubium)
  - "Ptenodactylus" woodwardi: A synonym of Pterodactylus woodwardi (nomen dubium)
