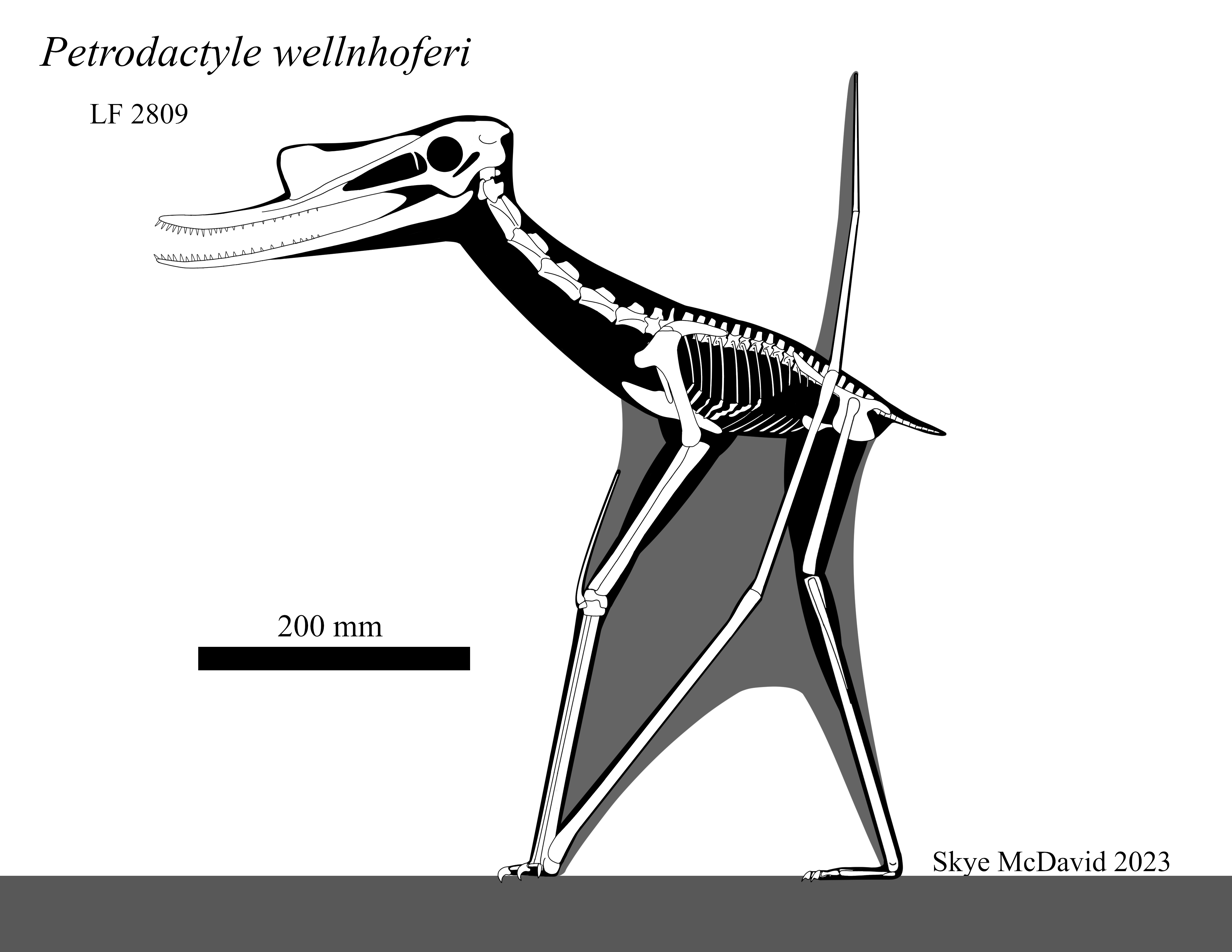
- Skeleton of Petrodactyle

Scientific classification
- Kingdom: Animalia
- Phylum: Chordata
- Class: Reptilia
- Order: †Pterosauria
- Suborder: †Pterodactyloidea
- Clade: †Ctenochasmatoidea
- Family: †Gallodactylidae (?)
- Genus: †Petrodactyle; Hone et al., 2023
- Species: †P. wellnhoferi

Binomial name
- †Petrodactyle wellnhoferi Hone et al., 2023

= Petrodactyle =

Petrodactyle Temporal range: Upper Jurassic, lower Tithonian

Extinct genus of ctenochasmatid pterosaurs

Petrodactyle (meaning "stone finger") is an extinct genus of ctenochasmatid pterosaur from the Late Jurassic Mörnsheim Formation (Solnhofen limestone) of Bavaria, Germany. The genus contains a single species, P. wellnhoferi, known from a partial skeleton belonging to a subadult individual. Petrodactyle is one of the largest Solnhofen pterosaurs and one of the largest Jurassic pterosaurs, with an estimated wingspan of 2.1 metres (6.9 ft).

== Discovery and naming ==
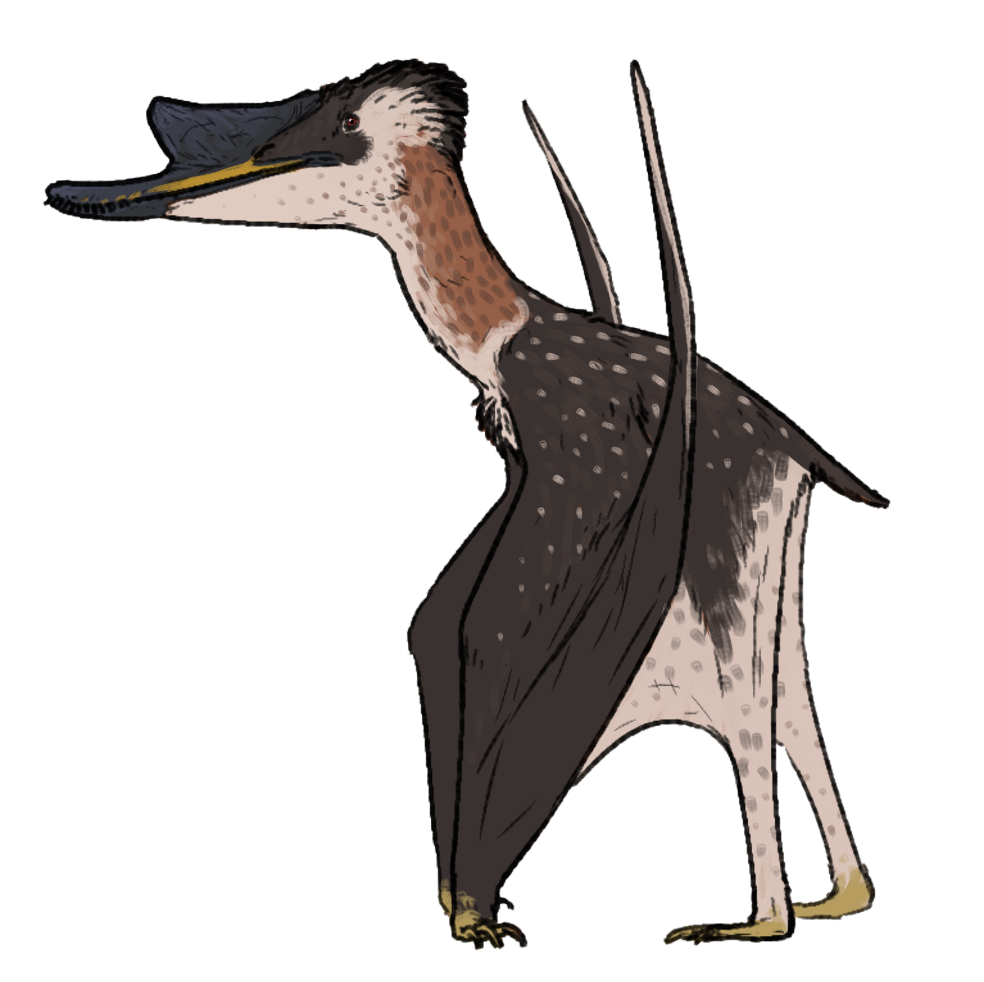
Life restoration

The holotype and only known specimen, LF 2809, was recovered from the "Dritte Rosa" layer of the Mörnsheim Formation, near Mühlheim in Bavaria, Germany. The specimen was initially discovered in a public visitor's quarry by Günther Zehetner and excavated by quarry owners Roland Pöschl and Uli Leonhard. LF 2809 was acquired by the Lauer Foundation for Paleontology, Science and Education in 2015 and is permanently deposited in their collections.

In 2023, Hone et al. described Petrodactyle wellnhoferi as a new genus and species of ctenochasmatid pterosaur based on these fossil remains. The generic name, "Petrodactyle", is derived from the Ancient Greek words petro, meaning "stone", and dactylus, meaning "finger". The name references the name given to Pterodactylus in its initial description in 1809, "Ptero-Dactyle", which was mistakenly printed as "Petro-Dactyle" on the cover. The specific name, "wellnhoferi" honours pterosaur researcher Peter Wellnhofer.

== Classification ==
Size comparison between Petrodactyle and a human

Hone et al. (2023) assigned Petrodactyle to the clade Ctenochasmatidae as a possible member or relative of the family Gallodactylidae. In their 2024 description of Skiphosoura, Hone et al. scored Petrodactyle into an extensively modified version of the phylogenetic dataset of Pêgas (2024). As was initially speculated by Hone and colleagues in 2023, Petrodactyle was recovered as closely affiliated with gallodactylid taxa such as Normannognathus and Cycnorhamphus. The results of their phylogenetic analysis are displayed in the cladogram below, with derived taxa abbreviated for simplicity.

- Archaeopterodactyloidea
  - Germanodactylus spp.
  - - Pterodactylus
    - - Diopecephalus
      - - - Petrodactyle
          - - Normannognathus
            - - Gallodactylus
              - Cycnorhamphus
        - - Aerodactylus
          - Derived ctenochasmatoids
