= Pterodactyl (disambiguation) =

Pterodactyl is an informal term for pterosaurs, based on the genus of the first pterosaur known to science, Pterodactylus.

Pterodactyl may also refer to:

- Pterodactyl (film), a horror film
- Westland-Hill Pterodactyl, a series of experimental aircraft designs starting in the 1920s
- Chengdu Pterodactyl I, an unmanned aerial vehicle developed in the People's Republic of China
- Pterodactyl Ascender, a family of ultralight aircraft that were sold in kit form between 1979 and 1984

== See also ==
- Pterodactylid, a pterosaur of the family Pterodactylidae
- Pterodactyloid, a pterosaur of the suborder Pterodactyloidea
- Pteranodon, a pterosaur often used as a basis for common depictions of "pterodactyls" in popular media
- Petrodactyle, a pterosaur named after a typographical error in an early description of Pterodactylus
