= 1826 in paleontology =

Paleontology or palaeontology is the study of prehistoric life forms on Earth through the examination of plant and animal fossils. This includes the study of body fossils, tracks (ichnites), burrows, cast-off parts, fossilised feces (coprolites), palynomorphs and chemical residues. Because humans have encountered fossils for millennia, paleontology has a long history both before and after becoming formalized as a science. This article records significant discoveries and events related to paleontology that occurred or were published in the year 1826.

== Dinosaurs ==
=== Newly named dinosaurs ===
Name	Novelty	Status	Author(s)	Age	Unit	Location	Notes	Images
Hikanodon	Gen. nov.	Jr. synonym	Nöggerath	Barremian, 126–125 mya	Tilgate Forest	England	In a brief description of a fossil reptile from the "iron sands" of England, Nöggerath mentions that Mantell has named the taxon Hikanodon, creating an invalid junior objective synonym of Iguanodon named the year earlier.	
Megalosaurus conybeari	Sp. nov.	Nomen oblitum	von Ritgen	Bathonian	Taynton Limestone Formation	England	A species name for Megalosaurus, but forgotten to history.	

== Pterosaurs ==
=== New taxa ===
Name	Novelty	Status	Author(s)	Age	Unit	Location	Notes	Images
Pterodactylus nettecephaloides	Sp. nov.	Jr. synonym	von Ritgen	Tithonian	Solnhofen limestone	Germany	A junior objective synonym of Pterodactylus brevirostris.	
Pterodactylus crocodilocephaloides	Sp. nov.	Jr. synonym	von Ritgen	Tithonian	Solnhofen limestone	Germany	A junior objective synonym of Pterodactylus longirostris.	
