= Aerodactyl =

Aerodactyl may refer to:

- Aerodactylus, an extinct species of pterosaur
- Aerodactyl (Pokémon), a Pokémon species
