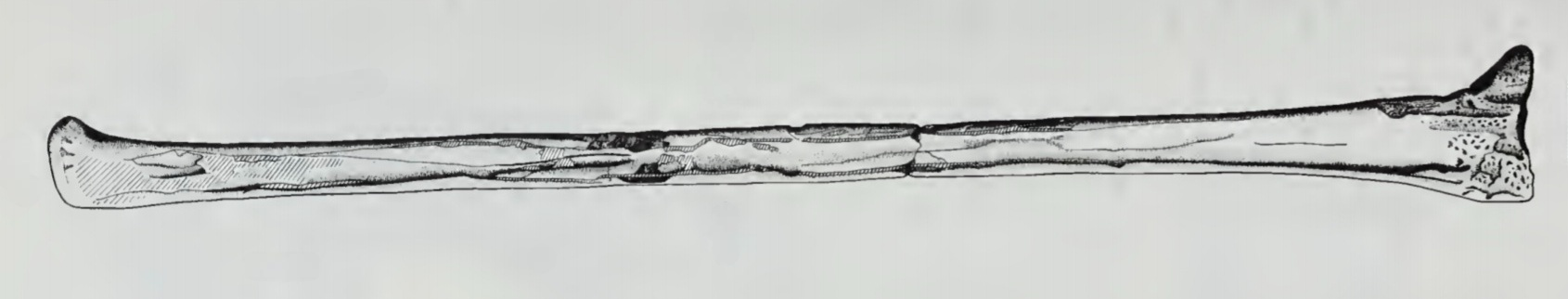
- Holotype phalanx of D. validus

Scientific classification
- Domain: Eukaryota
- Kingdom: Animalia
- Phylum: Chordata
- Order: †Pterosauria
- Suborder: †Pterodactyloidea
- Family: †Azhdarchidae
- Genus: †Doratorhynchus; Seeley, 1875

Type species
- †Doratorhynchus validus (Owen, 1875 (originally Pterodactylus)

= Doratorhynchus =

Doratorhynchus Temporal range: Late Jurassic–Early Cretaceous

Extinct genus of reptiles

Doratorhynchus is a generic replacement name for Pterodactylus validus, in 1875 suggested by Harry Govier Seeley. Today it is considered a nomen vanum.

In 1870 Richard Owen named Pterodactylus validus based on holotype NHMUK 40653, a thirty centimeter long partial wing finger phalanx from the Purbeck Limestone (Britain), identified as that of a pterosaur. The specific name means "strong" in Latin.

In late December 1868 Seeley had obtained a vertebra and lower jaw (catalogued CAMSM J.5340 and J.5339 respectively) from a quarry near Langton Matravers; in 1869 he had informally named these "Pterodactylus macrurus". In 1875, he concluded that the remains were conspecific with P. validus (he re-identified the vertebra he had previously considered a caudal as belonging to the cervical region), erecting a separate genus name to the species: Doratorhynchus, from Greek dory, "lance" and rhynchos, "snout", referring to the jaw form, so that the full species name became Doratorhynchus validus. Later the species was sometimes assigned to other genera, resulting in the new combinations Ornithocheirus validus (Newton 1888) and Cycnorhamphus validus (Owen 1870). CAMSM J.5340 indicated that very long-necked forms already lived in the Late Jurassic (Tithonian) or Early Cretaceous (Berriasian). It was suggested that Doratorhynchus was a basal member of Azhdarchidae. However, in 1995 Stafford Howse and Andrew R. Milner concluded that Doratorhynchus is a nomen vanum because they noted that the phalanx was not diagnostic enough anyway and only assignable to Pterodactyloidea incertae sedis. They assigned CAMSM J.5339 to Gnathosaurus as G. macrurus and CAMSM J.5340 to an indeterminate ctenochasmatid.

== See also ==
- List of pterosaur genera
- Timeline of pterosaur research
