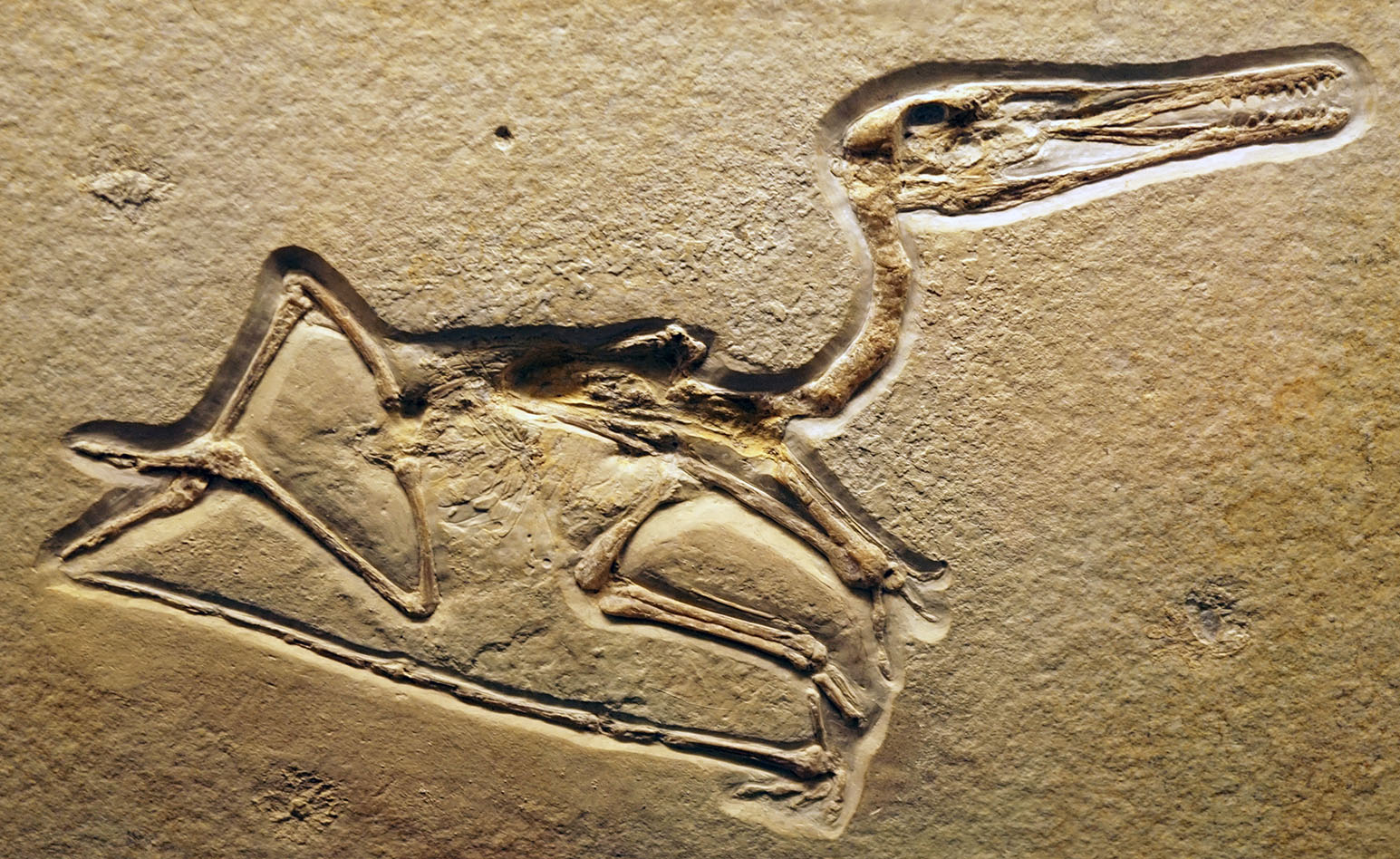
- Fossil in Augsburg Naturmuseum

Scientific classification
- Kingdom: Animalia
- Phylum: Chordata
- Class: Reptilia
- Order: †Pterosauria
- Suborder: †Pterodactyloidea
- Clade: †Euctenochasmatia
- Genus: †Diopecephalus; Seeley, 1871

Species
- †D. kochi (type) (Wagner, 1837 (originally Ornithocephalus)

= Diopecephalus =

Diopecephalus Temporal range: Tithonian

Genus of euctenochasmatian pterosaur from the Late Jurassic

Diopecephalus is a genus of pterodactyloid pterosaur from the Lower Tithonian (Upper Jurassic) of the Lithographic Limestone, Bavaria, Germany. The type and only species is D. kochi, although the name has been applied to Pterodactylus longicollum, with longicollum erroneously listed as the type species.

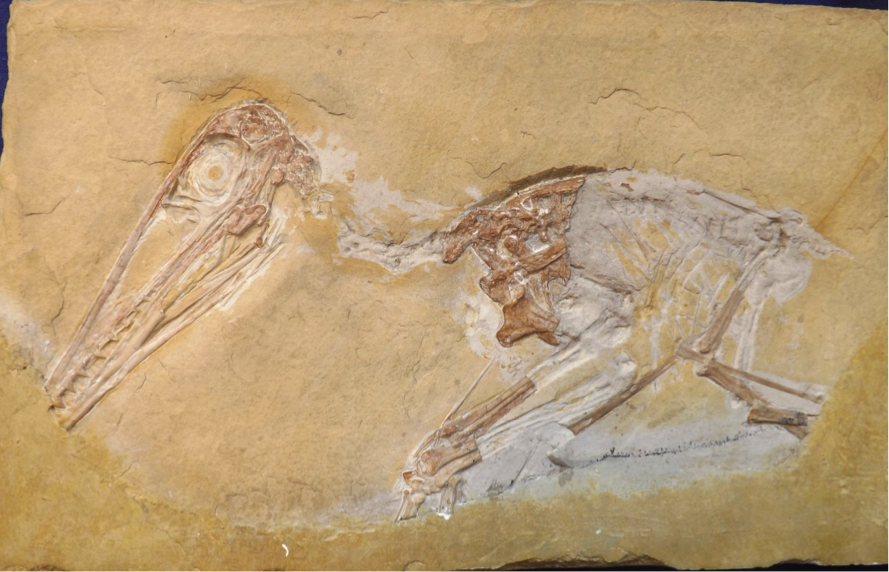
Juvenile type specimen

== Assigned species ==
Like many pterosaurs, it has had a confusing taxonomic history, being given names by various authorities which identify it with four other genera:

- Pterodactylus longicollum (von Meyer 1854)
- Pterodactylus vulturinus (Wagner 1857)
- Pterodactylus longicollis (Wagner 1858)
- Pterodactylus suevicus (Fraas 1878)
- Cycnorhamphus fraasii (Seeley 1891)
- Pterodactylus frassi (Seeley 1901)
- Gallodactylus longicollum (Fabre 1974)
- Ornithocephalus longipes (Olshevsky 1978) (Ornithocephalus is an obsolete name for Pterodactylus)
- Ornithocephalus vulturinus (Olshevsky 1978)

In 1871, British paleontogist Harry Govier Seeley in a footnote of a supplement to his pterosaur book The Ornithosauria, named a new genus Diopecephalus combining in it four already published taxa: "Another unnamed generic type is typified by Pterodactylus longicollum, P. rhamphastinus, and the two species included under the name P. kochi. In this genus the middle hole of the skull is entirely wanting. For it I suggest the name Diopecephalus". The generic name Diocephalus was derived from Greek di, "two", ὀπή, opè, "hole" and kephalè, "head". It refers to Seeley's (mistaken) assumption that the antorbital fenestra was lacking in the snout side, leaving only the nostril and the eye socket. The "two species of P. kochi" according to Stephen Christopher Bennett refer to the holotype of P. kochi Wagner, 1837 (specimens SM 404 & BSP AS.XIX.3) and that of P. scolopaciceps (von Meyer, 1859): specimen BSP AS.V.29.

In 2017, Steven U. Vidovic and David M. Martill resurrected the genus Diopecephalus for Pterodactylus kochi, a taxon generally regarded as synonymous with Pterodactylus antiquus. Though historically considered distinct from antiquus, most modern analyses of kochi anatomy strongly suggest it represents a juvenile P. antiquus. Pterosaur expert Christopher Bennett noted that some allegedly diagnostic kochi anatomy actually reflected measurement errors of the kochi holotype, and that once corrected the two species cannot be adequately distinguished from one another. Vidovic and Martill's suggestion that kochi is taxonomically distinct rely on a combination of characteristics rather than autapomorphies, including features such as the slope of the snout and the rounded shape of the back of the skull, the shape and distribution of teeth, and the length and depth of the cervical vertebrae. Most of these features are typical for Pterodactylus or are known to vary with growth stage and, as per Vidovic and Martill's previous work with another resurrected Pterodactylus-like genus, Aerodactylus, arguments discounting individual variation and preservational factors (e.g., specimen orientation, compression) from true taxonomic distinction were not provided. Further work is likely needed to validate D. kochi as a genuine taxon, and not a synonym of P. antiquus.

A reevaluation of the relationship between Pterodactylus and Diopecephalus finds Diopecephalus not only distinct from Pterodactylus, but also not closely related, recovering it as a basal pterodactyloid.

== Classification ==
Below is a cladogram showing the results of a phylogenetic analysis presented by Andres, Clark & Xu, 2014. In the analysis, they identified Diopecephalus as Pterodactylus kochi, and sister taxon of Pterodactylus antiquus within the clade Euctenochasmatia.

- Archaeopterodactyloidea
  - Germanodactylidae
    - Normannognathus wellnhoferi
    - - Germanodactylus cristatus
      - Germanodactylus rhamphastinus
  - Euctenochasmatia
    - - Pterodactylus antiquus
      - Pterodactylus kochi (Diopecephalus)
    - - Ardeadactylus longicollum
      - Ctenochasmatoidea

A 2024 study finds it to be a basal pterodactyloid, while P. antiquus remains the most basal member of the Euctenochasmatia.
