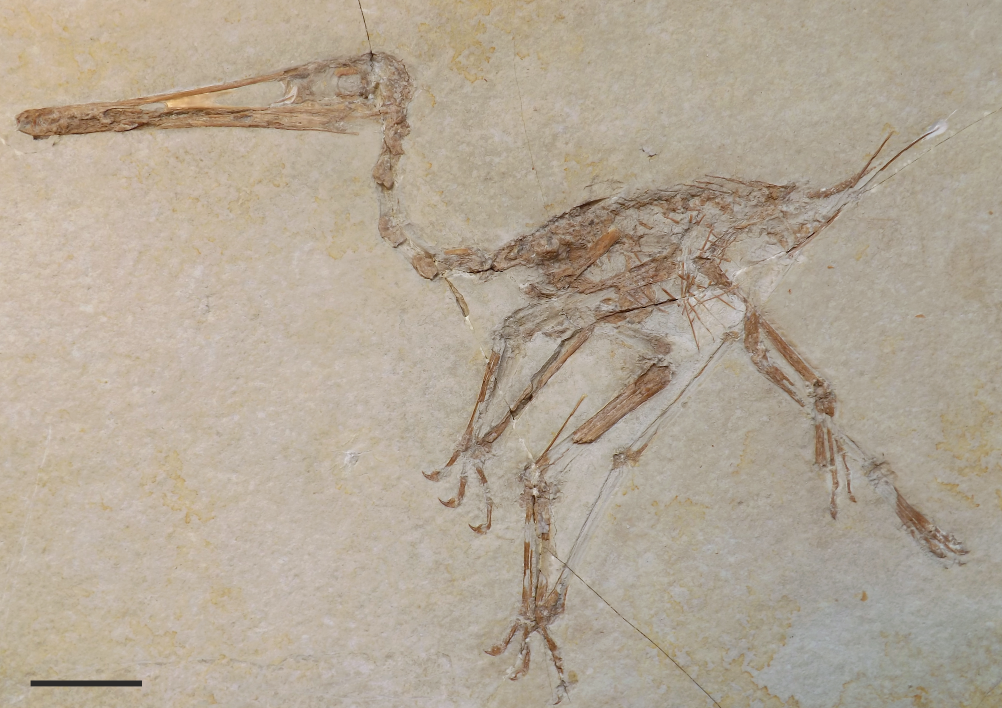
- Type specimen

Scientific classification
- Kingdom: Animalia
- Phylum: Chordata
- Class: Reptilia
- Order: †Pterosauria
- Suborder: †Pterodactyloidea
- Clade: †Aurorazhdarchia
- Genus: †Aerodactylus; Vidovic & Martill, 2014

Type species
- †Pterodactylus scolopaciceps Meyer, 1860

Species
- †A. scolopaciceps (Meyer, 1860)

Synonyms
- Pterodactylus scolopaciceps Meyer, 1860

= Aerodactylus =

Aerodactylus Temporal range: Late Jurassic, 150.8–148.5 Ma

Genus of archaeopterodactyloid pterosaur from the Late Jurassic

Aerodactylus (meaning "wind finger", after the Pokémon Aerodactyl) is a pterosaur genus containing a single species, Aerodactylus scolopaciceps. The fossil remains of this species have been found only in the Solnhofen limestone of Bavaria, Germany, dated to the late Jurassic Period (early Tithonian), about 150.8–148.5 million years ago. The validity of Aerodactylus has been disputed, with some pterosaur experts suggesting that none of the specimens referred to this genus are distinguishable from Pterodactylus.

== History and disputed status ==
=== Taxonomic history ===
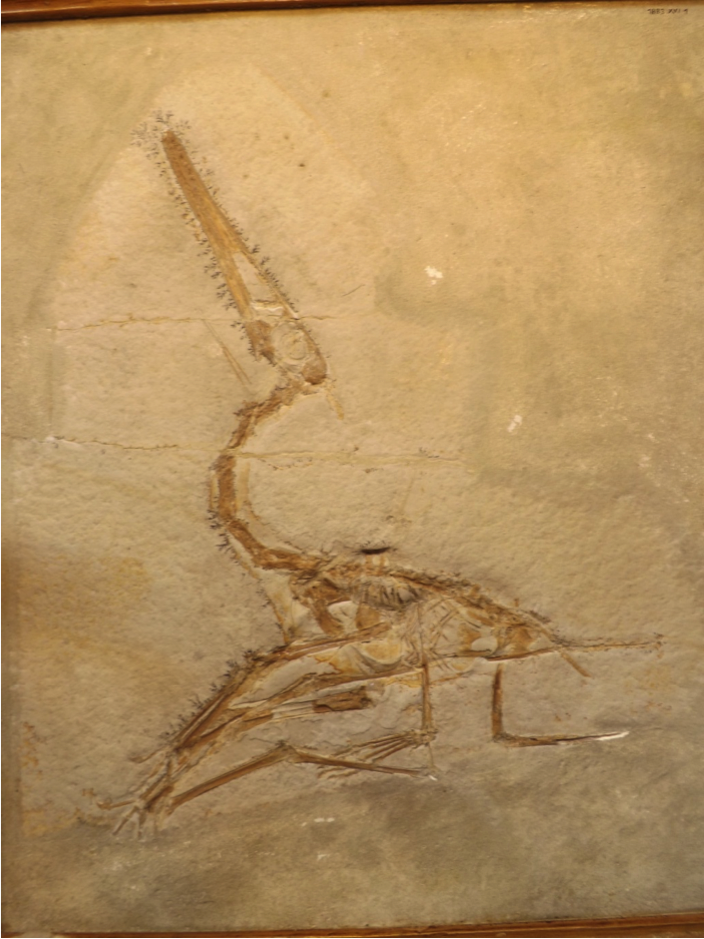
Specimen preserving a soft-tissue head crest and lappet (BSP 1883 XVI 1).

In 1850 Hermann von Meyer described the specimen now known by its collection number BSP AS V 29 a/b, which had been recovered from the Solnhofen limestone of Bavaria, Germany, as a new specimen of Pterodactylus longirostris. The same specimen was discussed in another volume by Meyer, Fauna der Vorwelt, published in 1860. By that point, he regarded it as a species of its own, and referred to it as Pterodactylus scolopaciceps. The validity of P. scolopaciceps was viewed with skepticism: Johann Andreas Wagner believed that any diagnostic features could be attributed to taphonomic artefacts or misinterpretations of the fossil. Karl Alfred Ritter von Zittel agreed with Wagner's assessment, and in 1883, synonymised it with P. kochi (now considered its own genus, Diopecephalus). In 1938, Ferdinand Broili described a pterosaur specimen (BSP 1937 I 18) recovered near Eichstätt. Disagreeing with Wagner and Zittel, he assigned the specimen to P. scolopaciceps, contending that it was a valid taxon. Peter Wellnhofer disagreed with Broili's attempt at resurrecting the taxon, and in 1970 upheld Zittel's proposed synonymy with P. kochi. In 2013, Christopher S. Bennett reviewed the taxonomy of Pterodactylus, and synonymised P. kochi with the type species of Pterodactylus, P. antiquus.

In 2014, Steven U. Vidovic and David M. Martill re-examined von Meyer and Broili's specimens, along with four others, all juveniles. They concluded that P. scolopaciceps was not only separate from P. kochi (which they found to be paraphyletic, with some specimens likely being their own genus) but from Pterodactylus altogether. Instead, based on morphological comparisons and phylogenetic analyses, they suggested that it was closer to Ardeadactylus, Aurorazhdarcho, and Cycnorhamphus. They described P. scolopaciceps as a new taxon, and gave it the name Aerodactylus scolopaciceps. The generic name derives from the Greek aero (wind) and dactylus (finger), and was chosen in reference to Aerodactyl, a Pokémon based on an amalgamation of different pterosaur groups.

=== Validity ===
Four years after Vidovic and Martill's paper, however, Bennett challenged its validity. He contended that A. scolopaciceps was named based on skull features that were only trivially different from those of Pterodactylus, that Aerodactylus was founded on an unnatural assemblage of specimens, and that no evidence had been presented to rule out the effects of taphonomy or individual variation. Further, he concluded that Vidovic and Martill had provided no arguments of any taxonomic significance. Therefore, he concluded that A. scolopaciceps is a junior synonym of Pterodactylus antiquus. Robert S. H. Smyth and David Unwin, in 2024, agreed with his assessment, and concluded that A. scolopaciceps consists of juvenile P. antiquus specimens.

== Description ==
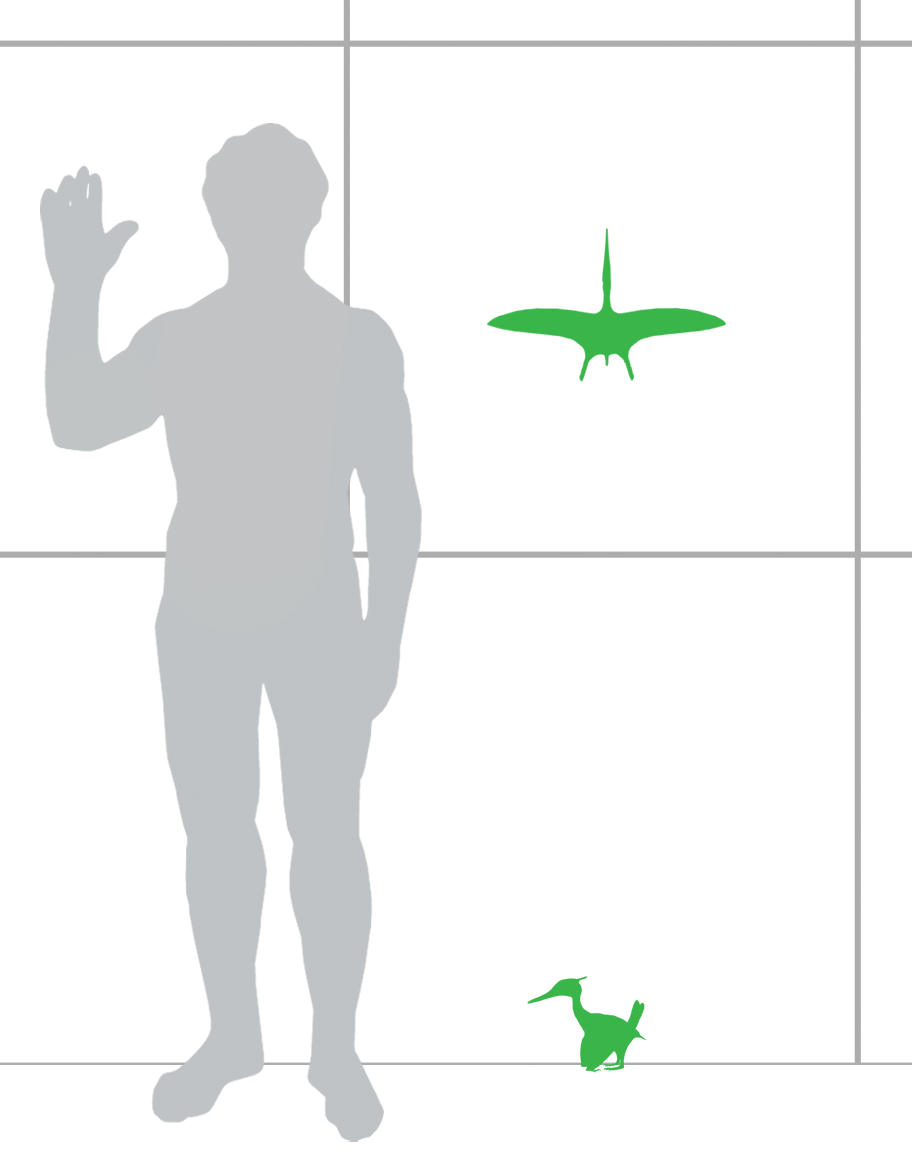
Size of the largest known specimen (MCZ 1505) compared with a human.

Aerodactylus is known from six fossil specimens, and though all of them are juveniles, all preserve complete skeletons. Like all pterosaurs, the wings of Aerodactylus were formed by a skin and muscle membrane stretching from its elongated fourth finger to its hind limbs. It was supported internally by collagen fibres and externally by keratinous ridges. The skulls of Aerodactylus were long and narrow with about 64 teeth which were more crowded towards the jaw tips. The teeth extended back from the tips of both jaws, and the tooth row ended before the front of the nasoantorbital fenestra, the largest opening in the skull. Unlike some related species, the skull and upper jaw was curved slightly upward, not straight. A small, hooked beak was present in the very tips of the jaws, with both upper and lower hook no larger than the teeth that surrounded them.

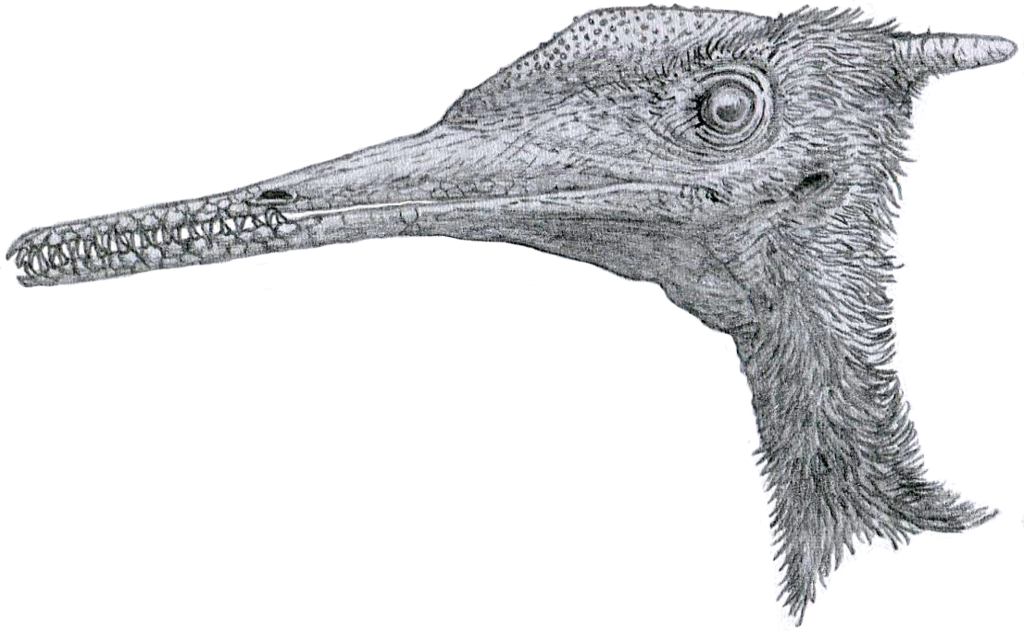
Restoration of the head.

The neck was long, and covered in long, bristle-like pycnofibres. A throat pouch extended from about the middle of the lower jaw to the upper part of the neck.

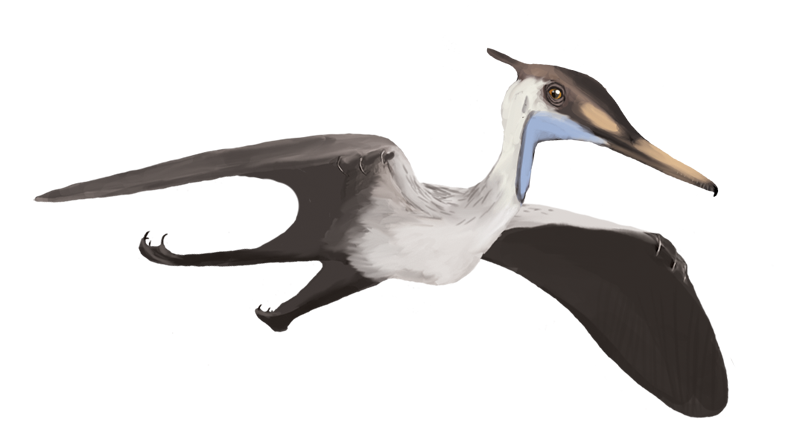
Life restoration based on specimen MCZ 1505, by Matthew Martyniuk.

Aerodactylus, like related pterosaurs, had a crest on its skull composed mainly of soft tissues along the top of the skull. One specimen (MCZ 1505, the counter slab of BSP 1883 XVI 1) shows a roughly triangular soft tissue crest extending upward above the posterior half of the naso-antorbital fenestra and the eye; the crest was 44 to 51 mm long (around 38 to 45% of the total length of the skull) and reached a maximum height of 9.5 mm.

Bennett (2013) noted that other authors claimed that the soft tissue crest of Pterodactylus extended backward behind the skull; Bennett himself, however, didn't find any evidence for the crest extending past the back of the skull. The back of the skull bore a small crest or "lappet" which pointed backward in a cone-shaped structure. The lappet was composed mainly of long, stiffened fibres twisted together in a spiral pattern inside a conical sheath of soft tissue.

The wings were long, and the wing membranes appear to have lacked the furry covering of pycnofibres present in some other pterosaurs (such as Pterorhynchus and Jeholopterus). The wing membrane extended between the fingers and toes as webbing, and a uropatagium (secondary membrane between the feet and tail) was present, as well as a propatagium (membrane between the wrist and shoulder). Both the finger and toe claws were covered in keratin sheaths that extended and curved into sharp hooks well beyond their bony cores.

== See also ==
- Timeline of pterosaur research
