= Christian Erich Hermann von Meyer =

German paleontologist

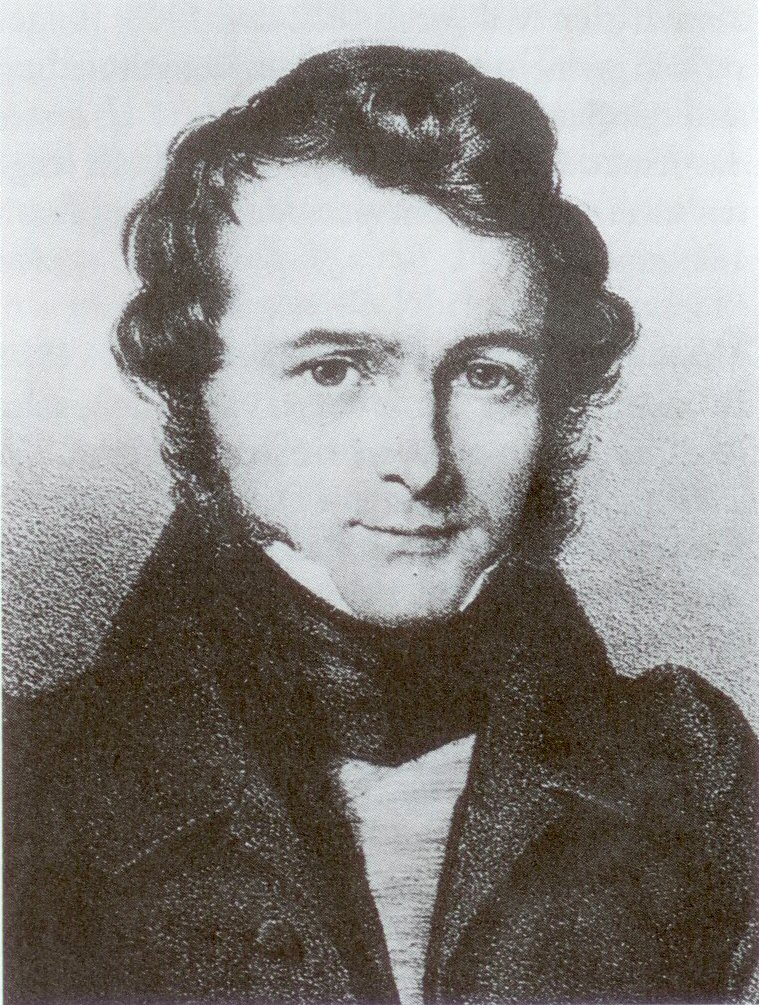
- Born: 3 September 1801; Frankfurt am Main
- Died: 2 April 1869 (aged 67)
- Occupation: Palaentologist
- Awards: Wollaston Medal (1858)

Christian Erich Hermann von Meyer (3 September 1801 – 2 April 1869), known as Hermann von Meyer, was a German palaeontologist. He was awarded the 1858 Wollaston medal by the Geological Society of London.

== Life ==
He was born in Frankfurt am Main. In 1832, Meyer issued a work entitled Palaeologica, and went on to publish a series of memoirs on various fossil organic remains: molluscs, crustaceans, fishes and higher vertebrata, including the Triassic predator Teratosaurus, the earliest bird Archaeopteryx lithographica (1861), the pterosaur Rhamphorhynchus, and the prosauropod dinosaur Plateosaurus.

In Palaeologica, Meyer proposed a classification of fossil reptiles into four major groups based on their limbs:

- Saurians with Toes Similar to those of Living Species (e.g.Teleosaurus, Protorosaurus, Streptospondylus)
- Saurians with Limbs Similar to Heavy Land Mammals (Iguanodon, Megalosaurus)
- Saurians with Limbs for Swimming (e.g. Plesiosaurus, Mosasaurus)
- Saurians with Flying Limbs (Pterodactylus)

His second group he belatedly termed Pachypodes in 1845, later revising to Pachypoda, from the Greek "pachy-/παχυ-" ("stout") and "pous/πους" ("foot"). He postulated the relation of this group to Dinosauria, coined a few years earlier by Richard Owen.

His more elaborate researches were those on the Carboniferous amphibia, the Permian reptiles, the Triassic amphibia and reptiles, and the reptiles of the Lithographic slates; and the results were embodied in his great work Zur Fauna der Vorwelt (1845–1860), profusely illustrated with plates drawn on stone by the author.

He was associated with W Dunker and Karl Alfred von Zittel in the publication of the Palaeontographica, which began in 1851. He was awarded the Wollaston medal by the Geological Society of London in 1858. Two years later, he was elected to the American Philosophical Society.

Today, Meyer is probably best known for describing and naming the prosauropod dinosaur Plateosaurus engelhardti from Central Europe.

== See also ==
- Category:Taxa named by Christian Erich Hermann von Meyer

== Sources ==
- Meyer, H. von (1837): [Mitteilung an Prof. Bronn] (Plateosaurus engelhardti). Neues Jahrbuch für Geologie und Paläontologie 316 [Article in German].
- Creisler, B (1995): "Pondering the Pachypoda: Von Meyer and the Dinosaur" The Dinosaur Report Winter 1995, pp. 10–11.
