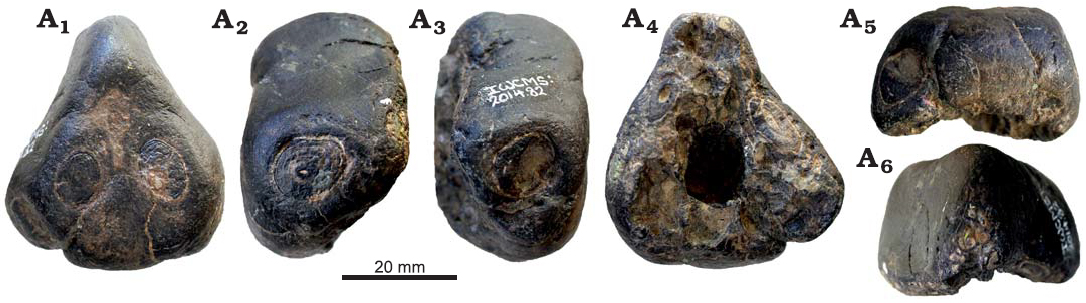
- Holotype snout

Scientific classification
- Kingdom: Animalia
- Phylum: Chordata
- Class: Reptilia
- Order: †Pterosauria
- Suborder: †Pterodactyloidea
- Family: †Anhangueridae
- Subfamily: †Coloborhynchinae
- Genus: †Tylodorhynchus; Pêgas & Holgado, 2026

Type species
- †Uktenadactylus rodriguesae Holgado & Pêgas, 2020

= Tylodorhynchus =

Tylodorhynchus Temporal range: Early Cretaceous, Barremian

Genus of anhanguerid pterosaur

Tylodorhynchus is an extinct genus of anhanguerid pterosaurs from the Early Cretaceous (Barremian stage) Wessex Formation on the Isle of Wight, England. The genus contains a single species, Tylodorhynchus rodriguesae, based on a single partial snout originally assigned to Uktenadactylus.

== Discovery and naming ==
The only known Tylodorhynchus specimen was discovered in 2014 by Will Thurbin at Sudmour Point southwest coast of the Isle of Wight, England, the fossil pertains to the Wessex Formation. The specimen was subsequently donated to the Dinosaur Isle museum by Thurbin and given the specimen number IWCMS 2014.82. In 2015, paleontologist David Martill tentatively assigned this specimen as an indeterminate species of the genus Coloborhynchus, the first from the Isle of Wight. Martill considered Coloborhynchus to be a widespread genus, and assigned species typically assigned to distinct genera, such as the Moroccan Siroccopteryx and Uktenadactylus from the American Paw Paw Formation to the genus Coloborhynchus. Though slight differences were apparent from the type species Coloborhynchus clavirostris, they were not considered sufficient to establish a distinct species.

The genus Coloborhynchus has a complicated taxonomic history, and as conceived by the late 2010s it had a vast range in space and time. It was noted that it may be composed of multiple genera, though understanding remains hampered due to fragmentary remains. In 2020, Borja Holgado and Rubi Pêgas revised the taxonomy of the Coloborhynchus complex, recognizing three genera Coloborhynchus, Uktendactylus, and Nicorhynchus amongst the former species of Coloborhynchus. All were placed in the subfamily Coloborhynchinae, equivalent to the traditional understanding of Coloborhynchus. Regarding the Wessex specimen, it was assigned to the genus Uktenadactylus as it shared a round depression above the first pair of teeth and bulbous projection between the second set of teeth with Uktenadactylus wadleighi. However, multiple differences indicated it belonged to a distinct, second species of Uktenadactylus, which was named U. rodriguesae in honour of palaeontologist Taissa Rodrigues' work on anhanguerian pterosaurs.

In 2026, Pêgas and Holgado published a study based on a reassessment of IWCMS 2014.82. They found that though it did possess the traits previously thought shared with Uktendactylus, the resemblance was more superficial than previously thought with differences in the anatomy of both the depression and the projection between species. Additionally, it was found the bulbous projection on U. wadleighi may be due to a pathology rather than representing the typical anatomy of the animal. Upon revising the coding of "U." rodriguesae, it was also found that U. wadleighi was more closely related to Nicorhynchus than to "U." rodriguesae. Therefore, they assigned it to a new genus, Tylodorhynchus, combining the Ancient Greek words τυλώδης (tylōdēs, "callused") and ῥύγχος (rhynchos, "beak") based on the callus-like projection on the palate.

== Description ==
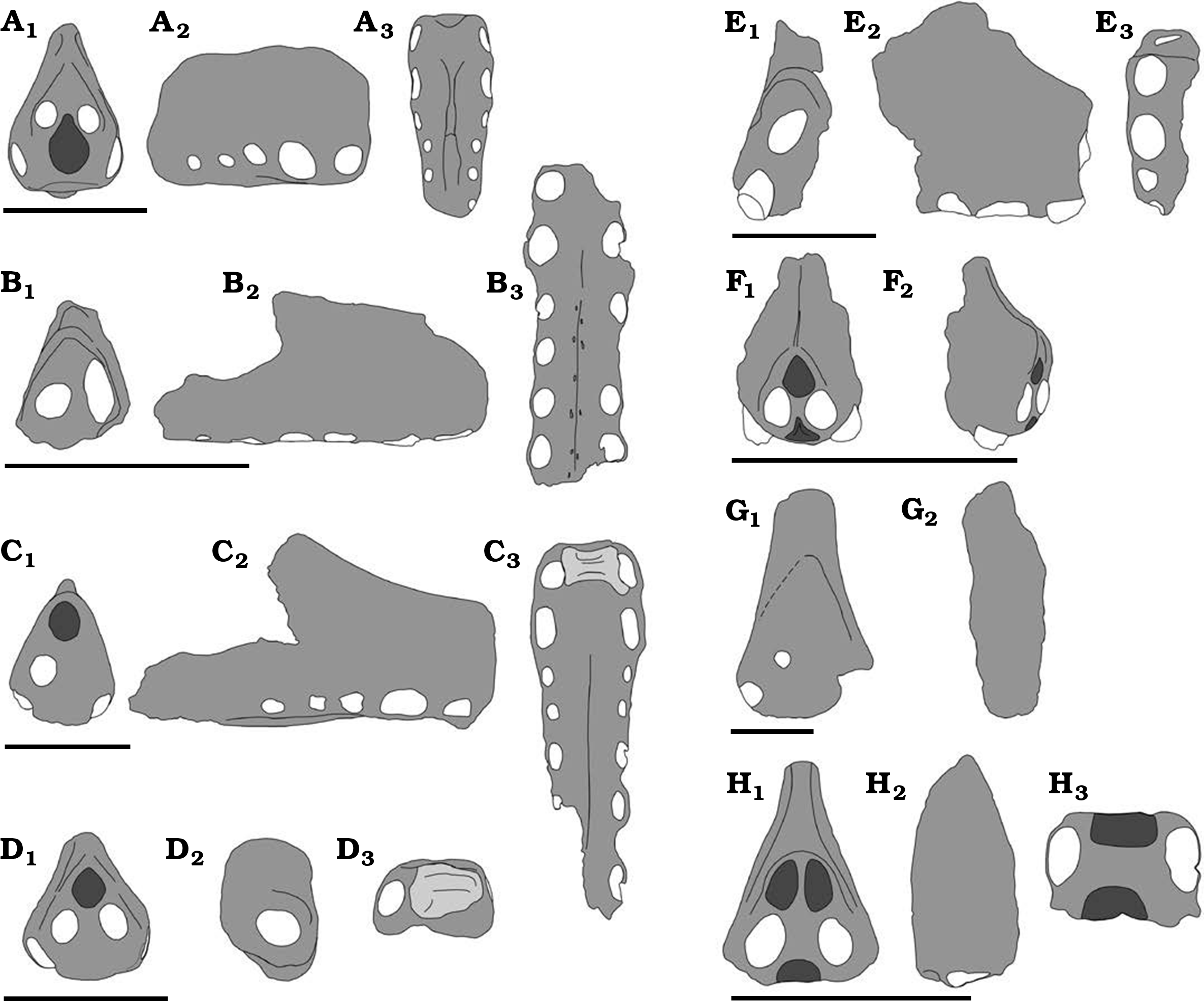
Holotype snout tip of Tylodorhynchus (D) compared to those of Aerodraco (B) and other coloborynchines: Coloborhynchus (A), Uktenadactylus (C), and Nicorhynchus (E-H). Tooth sockets are shown in white, while depressions are shown in black.

As an anhanguerid pterosaur, Tylodorhynchus would have been a large flying animal with an elongate snout filled with long, protruding teeth. As a member of the subfamily Coloborhynchinae, the end of this snout was boxy in shape, and the upper jaw ended in a flat, blunt front surface known as the deltoid facet. This surface was actually formed by the palate (the roof of the mouth), which had an upturned end in other anhanguerids but fully projected upwards at a ninety degree angle in coloborhynchines. Upon this palatal surface was the first pair of teeth, which were directed forwards. Like many other anhanguerids, it possessed an upright crest along the top of its snout. Unique traits of Tylodorhynchus amongst coloborhynchines include a large protruding knob between its second pair of teeth at the front of the mouth, a small blunt protuberance at the top of the deltoid facet at the base of the crest, and the low position of its first pair of teeth.

Only the front base of the crest is preserved, but it has a flat surface along its top margin unlike the grooved surface seen in Uktenadactylus and Nicorhynchus. At the base of the crest (at the top of the deltoid facet), there is a small blunt protrusion not seen in any other species of anhanguerid. The deltoid facet is triangular in shape, with concave margins unlike the straighter ones seen in Uktendactylus and Nicorhynchus, and more concave than in Coloborhynchus. Each species of coloborhynchine possesses a unique pattern of depressions (recessed areas of the bone). In Tylodorhynchus, one small round depression is found on the upper deltoid facet (above the first pair of teeth), and none is found at the bottom of the deltoid facet. The upper depression is only weakly depressed, and has poorly defined margins, unlike the more overt depressions found in Uktenadactylus and Nicorhynchus.

The first pair of teeth, which are found on the deltoid facet and point forwards, are positioned lower than those of other coloborhynchines. Specifically, the bottom of their tooth sockets are positioned lower than the top of the second tooth sockets, whereas in other coloborhynchines the first pair of teeth are entirely above the second. The second pair of teeth themselves point somewhat outwards, rather than being oriented directly downwards. Directly between this second pair of teeth is a large, knob-like protrusion that is continuous with the bottom of the deltoid facet. While this previously thought to be a characteristics shared with Uktenadactylus, the protrusion of the latter is now thought to be a possible pathology. Additionally, the protrusion in Tylodorhynchus is unlike that of Uktendadactylus in that it does not contact either of the adjacent tooth sockets.

== Classification ==
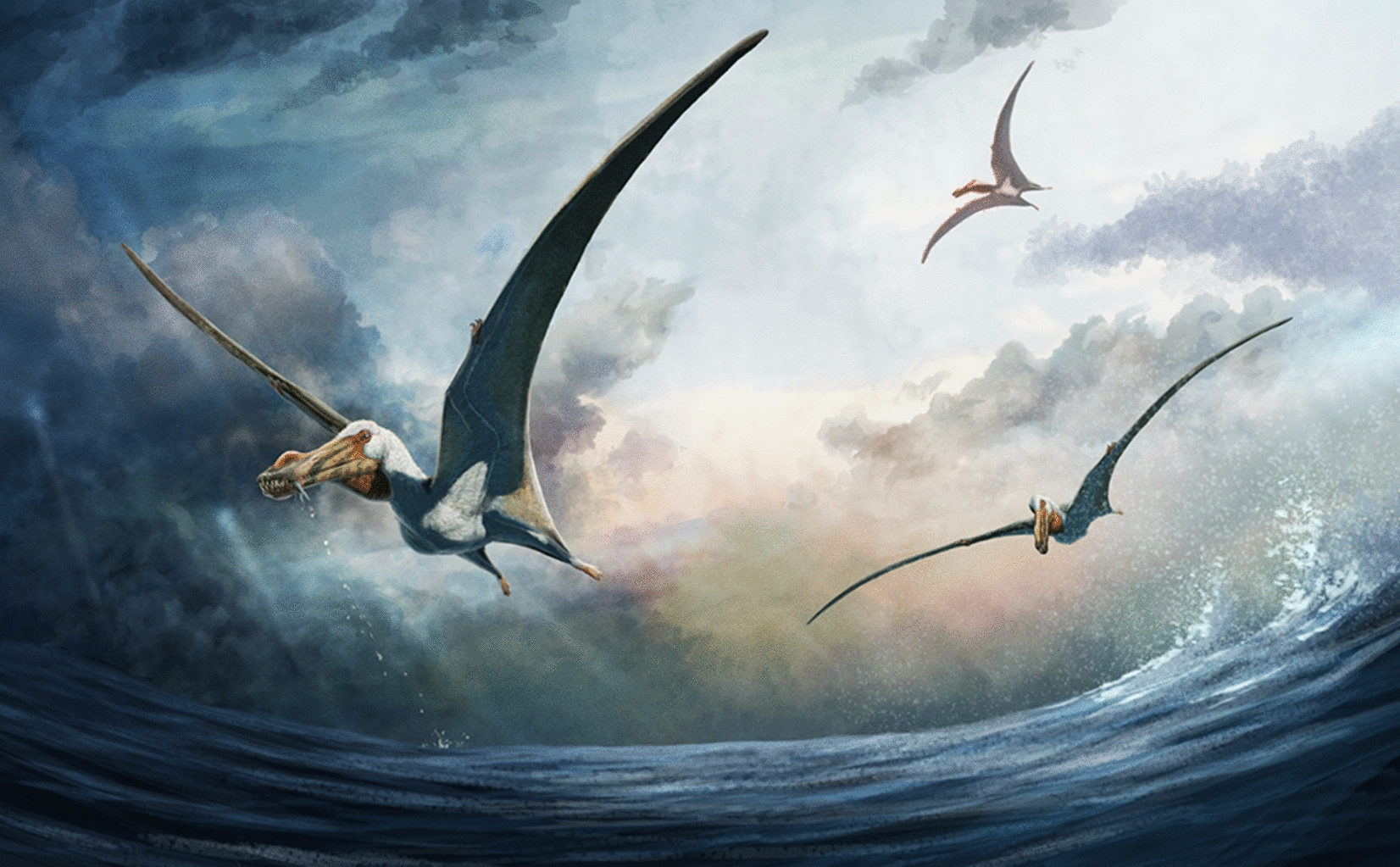
Life restoration of Haliskia, belonging to the tropeognathine lineage of anhanguerids

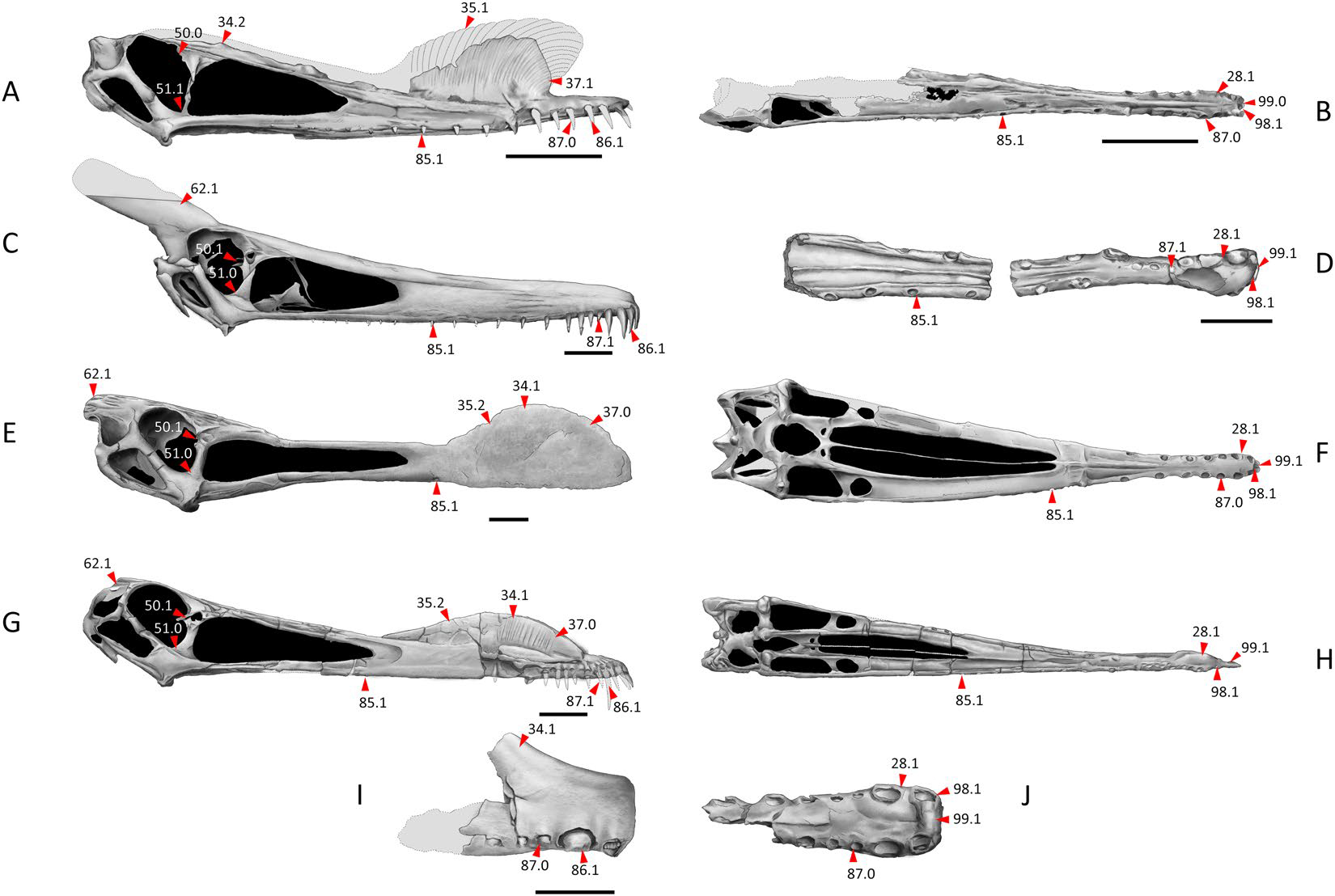
Skulls of the non-anhanguerid anhanguerian Hamipterus (A-B), anhanguerine Ludodactylus (C-D), tropeognathine Tropeognathus (E-F), anhanguerine Anhanguera (G-H), and coloborhynchine Uktenadactylus

In their 2026 phylogenetic analyses, Pêgas and Holgado recovered Tylodorhynchus within the subfamily Coloborhynchinae of the family Anhangueridae using the phylogenetic dataset of a prior study by Pêgas and colleagues. The simplified results are displayed in the cladogram below:

- Anhangueridae
  - Tropeognathinae
    - Tropeognathus
    - - - Haliskia
        - Ferrodraco
      - - Aerodraco
        - - Akharhynchus
          - Siroccopteryx
  - - Coloborhynchinae
      - Coloborhynchus
      - - Tylodorhynchus
        - - Uktenadactylus
          - Nicorhynchus spp.
    - Anhanguerinae
      - - Caulkicephalus
        - - Guidraco
          - Ludodactylus
      - - Liaoningopterus
        - - - Brasileodactylus
            - Maaradactylus
          - Anhanguera spp.

== See also ==
- List of pterosaur genera
- Timeline of pterosaur research
