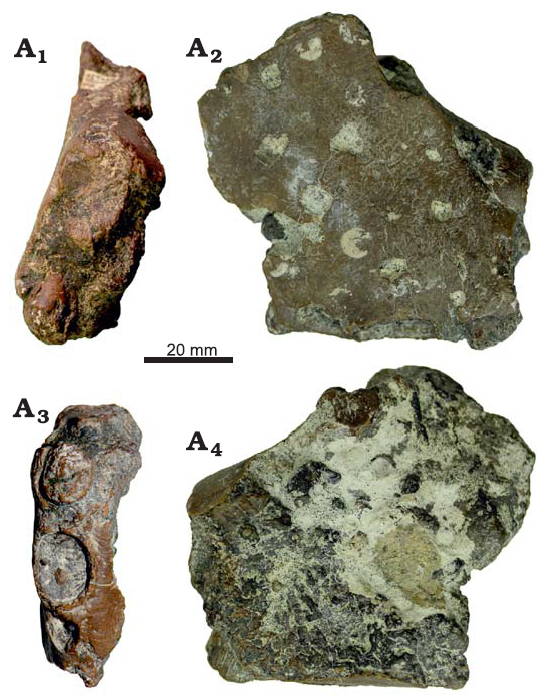
- Holotype jaw fragment of N. capito in multiple views

Scientific classification
- Kingdom: Animalia
- Phylum: Chordata
- Class: Reptilia
- Order: †Pterosauria
- Suborder: †Pterodactyloidea
- Clade: †Anhangueria
- Family: †Anhangueridae
- Subfamily: †Coloborhynchinae
- Genus: †Nicorhynchus; Holgado & Pêgas, 2020

Type species
- †Ornithocheirus capito Seeley, 1870

Species
- †N. capito (Seeley, 1870); †N. fluviferox (Jacobs et al., 2019)

Synonyms
- Synonyms of N. capito: Ornithocheirus capito Seeley, 1870; Coloborhynchus capito (Seeley, 1870); Ornithocheirus reedi Seeley, 1870; Criorhynchus reedi (Seeley, 1870); Coloborhynchus reedi (Seeley, 1870); Synonyms of N. fluviferox: Coloborhynchus fluviferox Jacobs et al., 2019

= Nicorhynchus =

Nicorhynchus Temporal range: Albian–Turonian, ~105–92.5 Ma

Genus of anhanguerid pterosaur from the Cretaceous period

Nicorhynchus (meaning "knucker snout", in reference to its likely ecology) is a genus of anhanguerid pterosaur from the Cretaceous period. It contains two species, the type species, N. capito, from the Cambridge Greensand of England, and N. fluviferox from the Kem Kem Group of Morocco. These species were previously assigned to Coloborhynchus.

== History ==
The genus Coloborhynchus has had a convoluted history, with many species having been assigned to the genus. In 2013, Rodrigues and Kellner considered Coloborhynchus to be monotypic, containing only C. clavirostris, and placed most other species in other genera, or declared them nomina dubia. One of these species was Coloborhynchus capito, which was originally named by Harry Seeley in 1870 as a species of Ornithocheirus. Its holotype is CAMSM B 54625, a snout. In 2001, this species was moved to Coloborhynchus by David Unwin, who also synonymized Ornithocheirus reedi (known from a lost specimen) with it. Rodrigues and Kellner recognized that the species was distinct from Coloborhynchus, but did not give it a new name pending the discovery of more complete material.

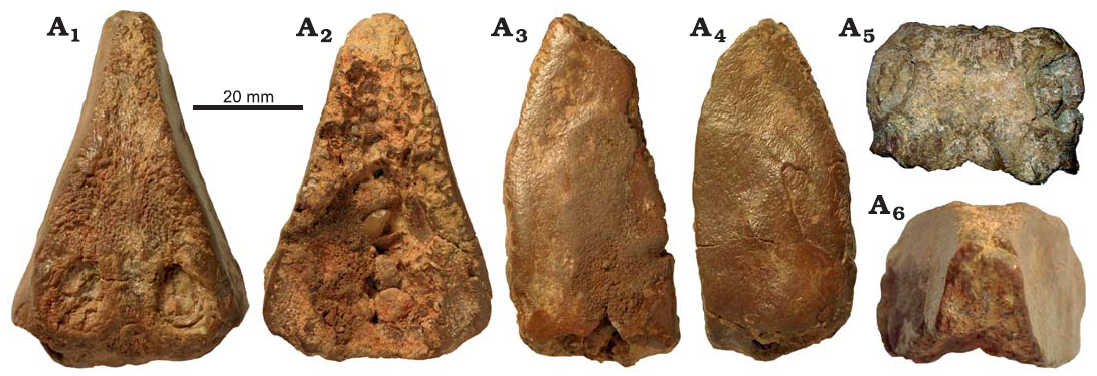
N. fluviferox holotype snout

In 2018, Jacobs et al. named a new species of Coloborhynchus, C. fluviferox from the Ifezouane Formation of the Kem Kem Group of Morocco based on a partial snout, and also tentatively referred another specimen from the same locality to a different, unnamed species. A 2020 review of a subfamily called Coloborhynchinae by Borja Holgado and Rubi Pêgas moved both C. capito and C. fluviferox to a new genus, Nicorhynchus, and also associated the unnamed Ifezouane Formation coloborhynchine to N. fluviferox. The name Nicorhynchus is derived from the Old English nicor (knucker, a kind of water dragon) and the Ancient Greek rhynchos ("snout"), in reference to its likely ecology as a fish-eating, flying reptile found in river and marine deposits.

However, a review of Kem Kem pterosaurs found the traits that distinguish Nicorhynchus from Coloborhynchus to be subtle enough to justify their synonymy, stating that the material was damaged and fragmentary enough to support this.

== Distinguishing features ==
The species N. capito represents the second largest known anhanguerid (after a Tropeognathus specimen), and indeed the second largest toothed pterosaur known after Tropeognathus. A referred specimen from the Cambridge Greensand of England described in 2011 consists of a very large upper jaw tip which displays the tooth characteristics that distinguish N. capito from other species. The jaw tip is nearly 10 cm (3.9 in) tall and 5.6 cm (2.2 in) wide, with teeth up to 1.3 cm (0.51 in) in base diameter. If the proportions of this specimen were consistent with species of Coloborhynchus, the total skull length could have been up to 75 cm (30 in), leading to an estimated wingspan of 7 m (23 ft).

=== Anatomy ===
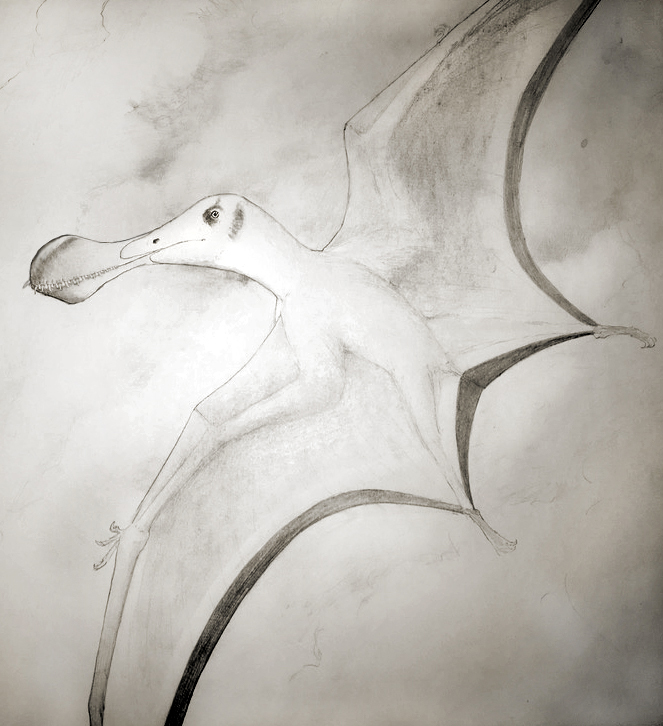
Restoration of N. fluviferox

As an anhanguerid pterosaur, Nicorhynchus would've been a large flying animal with a long snout filled with many long protruding teeth. The end of the snout formed a "rosette", a region wider than the rest of the jaw, and would have borne a prominent crest running along its top. As a member of Coloborhynchinae, this rosette would have a boxy shape, and the front of the snout (called the deltoid process) consisted of a flat surface derived from the palate, oriented at a perpendicular angle relative to the roof of the mouth. The first set of teeth, rooted in large oval sockets, projected directly forwards from the deltoid process. Second and third pairs of teeth were also enlarged, with a more ordinary orientation, and subsequent teeth would be smaller in size.

Compared to other coloborhynchines, Nicorhynchus is distinguished by the high shape of its deltoid process, taller than wide, a pair of ridges on either side of the deltoid process, a depressions on the bone surface between its first and second pairs of teeth, as well as an additional depression behind its second teeth absent in other taxa. It differs from Coloborhynchus in having its teeth (after the forward-oriented first position) pointing downwards, rather than somewhat flared to the side, and the front edge of the crest having a small groove running down its center. Both of these traits are shared with Uktenadactylus, but Nicorhynchus differs from it in lacking the distinctive protrusion at the tip of the jaw in Uktenadactylus, placed between the second apir of teeth. Each genus also differs in the pattern of depressions on the front of the snout; Coloborhynchus has a single oval depression immediately below the first pair of teeth, and Uktenadactylus has a round one above the first pair, whereas Nicorhynchus possesses depressions both above the first pair of teeth and below them, the latter in a lower position than in Coloborhynchus.

The recognized species of Nicorhynchus are distinguished by subtle traits of the front of the snout. On the top of the snout, the front of the crest is distinctly concave in N. capito, whereas that of N. fluviferox rises at a straight sixty degree angle and has a rugose texture. The ridges along the side of the deltoid process of N. capito are similarly rugose, convering to form a shallow central groove that transitions into the base of the crest. Both species possess a groove running along the center of the crest's front edge. Depressions on the surface of the deltoid process differ in the two species. N. capito possesses a single central rhomboid-shaped depression above the first pair of teeth, and the depression above the second pair possesses a sharp angular top edge. Contrastingly, N. fluviferox has two adjacent and nearly circular depressions above the first pair of teeth and lacks the angular edge of the depression and instead has a circular shape. The first set of teeth themselves differ in position between the two species; in N. capito the pair is placed fully above the second pair of teeth, whereas in N. fluviferox the first pair is lower and the center of the sockets is level with the top of the second pair of sockets. An additional potential morphology is seen in NHMUK PV R481, a specimen tentatively considered to belong to N. capito. The concave shape of the crest and overall shape of the deltoid process resembles that of other N. capito specimens, identifying it as a potential member of the species. However, the deltoid process as a whole is much taller than in other Nicorhynchus specimens, rising well over twice the height of the first pair of the teeth, which are unusually small. While it possible this indicates the existence of an additional species, it was noted as possible that erosion of the specimen exposed the roots of the tooth rather than the surface of the socket, altering its apparent shape and position and artificially giving the appearance of distinct anatomy.

== Classification ==
The describers of the genus, Holgado and Pêgas, had recovered Nicorhynchus within the subfamily Coloborhynchinae, which in turn was within the family Anhangueridae, sister taxon to Uktenadactylus. Their cladogram is shown below.

- Anhangueridae
  - Tropeognathinae
    - - Siroccopteryx
      - Tropeognathus
    - - Mythunga
      - Ferrodraco
  - Coloborhynchinae
    - Aerodraco
    - - Coloborhynchus
      - - Nicorhynchus
        - Uktenadactylus
  - Anhanguerinae
    - - Caulkicephalus
      - Guidraco
      - Ludodactylus
    - - Liaoningopterus
      - - Cearadactylus
        - Maaradactylus
      - Anhanguera
