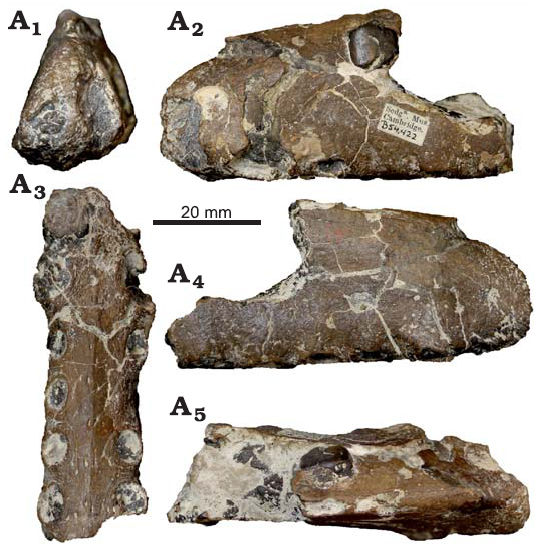
- Holotype snout in multiple views

Scientific classification
- Kingdom: Animalia
- Phylum: Chordata
- Class: Reptilia
- Order: †Pterosauria
- Suborder: †Pterodactyloidea
- Clade: †Ornithocheirae
- Clade: †Anhangueria
- Family: †Anhangueridae
- Genus: †Aerodraco; Holgado & Pêgas, 2020

Type species
- †Pterodactylus sedgwickii Owen, 1859

Species
- †Aerodraco sedgwickii (Owen, 1859)

Synonyms
- Pterodactylus sedgwickii Owen, 1859; Ornithocheirus sedgwicki (Owen, 1859); Coloborhynchus sedgwickii (Owen, 1859); Camposipterus(?) sedgwickii (Owen, 1859)

= Aerodraco =

Aerodraco Temporal range: Albian–Cenomanian, ~105–100 Ma

Genus of anhanguerid pterosaur from the Cretaceous period

Aerodraco (meaning "air dragon") is a genus of anhanguerid pterosaur from the Albian–Cenomanian-age Cambridge Greensand of England. It contains only one species, Aerodraco sedgwickii. It was originally assigned to the genus Pterodactylus.

== Discovery and naming ==
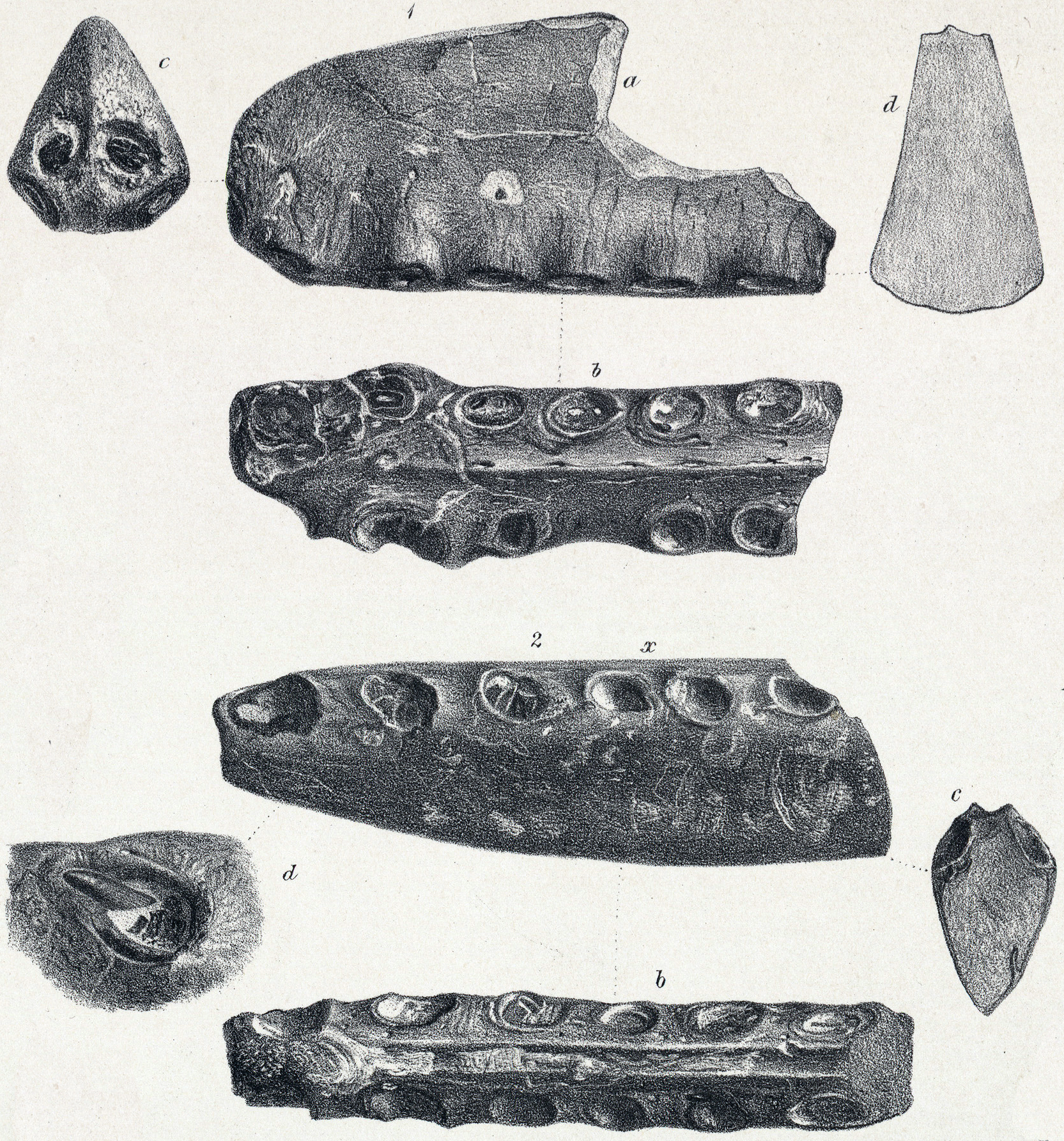
Holotype and a lower jaw (specimen CAMSM B54421) Richard Owen claimed belonged to the same specimen

In 1859, Sir Richard Owen named pterosaur material from the Cambridge Greensand of England as Pterodactylus sedgwickii. At the time, Pterodactylus was a wastebasket taxon; all sorts of unrelated pterosaurs were assigned to that genus. In 1870, Harry Seeley reassigned it to Ornithocheirus, another wastebasket taxon. Its specific name honors Adam Sedgwick. It was in 1869 renamed by Seeley into a Ptenodactylus sedgwickii, and in 1870 into a Ornithocheirus sedgwickii (by then it has been placed within the now obsolete Ornithosauria). In 1874, Owen again renamed it into Coloborhynchus sedgwickii. Owen in 1859 also referred a front of the lower jaws, specimen CAMSM B54421. However, this piece is not of the same individual as the holotype and there is no proof for any connection with Pterodactylus sedgwickii.

It was then largely ignored in modern literature until 2013, when Rodrigues and Kellner assigned it to their new genus Camposipterus. However, even they were unsure of this placement, calling it Camposipterus(?) sedgwickii. Finally, in 2020, Holgado and Pêgas assigned it to its own genus, Aerodraco; the genus name means "air dragon", in reference to the 1901 book Dragons of the Air by Harry Seeley.

== Description ==
Rodrigues & Kellner established two autapomorphies of Camposipterus(?) sedgwickii. The expanded section of the front snout is suddenly constricted behind the third tooth pair. The tooth sockets of the third tooth pair are much larger than those of the fourth pair. There is a unique combination of traits: the snout is deep; the midline ridge on the palate towards the front reaches a position behind the third tooth pair, which distinguishes Aerodraco from Camposipterus.

== Classification ==
In 2020, Holgado & Pêgas placed Aerodraco in the subfamily Coloborhynchinae, which they placed in the family Anhangueridae. They found it completely unrelated to Pterodactylus, the genus Aerodraco was originally placed within during 1859. The cladogram below shows their phylogenetic analysis.

- Anhangueridae
  - Tropeognathinae
    - - Siroccopteryx
      - Tropeognathus
    - - Mythunga
      - Ferrodraco
  - Coloborhynchinae
    - Aerodraco
    - - Coloborhynchus
      - - Nicorhynchus
        - Uktenadactylus
  - Anhanguerinae
    - - Caulkicephalus
      - Guidraco
      - Ludodactylus
    - - Liaoningopterus
      - - Cearadactylus
        - Maaradactylus
      - Anhanguera
