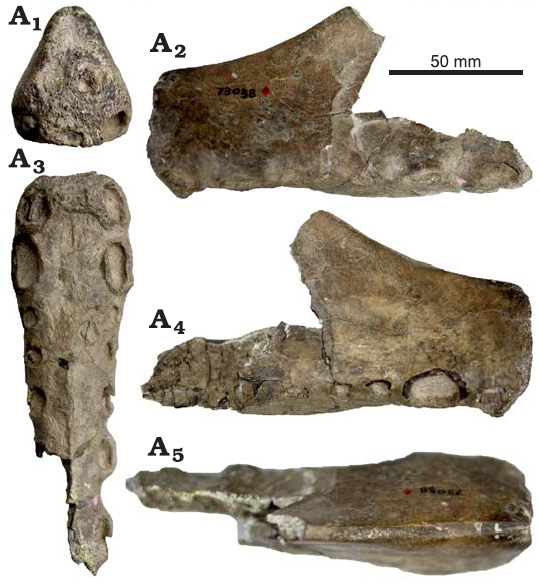
- U. wadleighi holotype snout in multiple views

Scientific classification
- Kingdom: Animalia
- Phylum: Chordata
- Class: Reptilia
- Order: †Pterosauria
- Suborder: †Pterodactyloidea
- Family: †Anhangueridae
- Subfamily: †Coloborhynchinae
- Genus: †Uktenadactylus; Rodrigues & Kellner, 2009

Type species
- †Coloborhynchus wadleighi Lee, 1994

= Uktenadactylus =

Uktenadactylus Temporal range: Early Cretaceous, Albian

Genus of anhanguerid pterosaur from the Early Cretaceous

Uktenadactylus is an extinct genus of anhanguerid pterodactyloid pterosaurs from the Early Cretaceous (Albian stage) Paw Paw Formation of Texas, United States. The genus contains a single species, Uktenadactylus wadleighi, known from a single partial snout originally assigned to Coloborhynchus.

== Discovery and naming ==
In 1994, Yuong Nam-Lee named a new species within the genus Coloborhynchus: Coloborhynchus wadleighi, based on a partial snout found in 1992 in Albian layers in Tarrant County, holotype SMU 73058 (Shuler Museum of Paleontology, Southern Methodist University at Dallas). The specific name honors the collector of the fossil, Chris Wadleigh. The reference of the species to the genus Coloborhynchus was based on the fact that both C. wadleighi and the type species of Coloborhynchus, Coloborhynchus clavirostris, share the trait of having three pairs of teeth laterally placed within a broad snout tip. This would distinguish both from the species Criorhynchus simus and justify a revival of the genus Coloborhynchus that had generally been considered identical to the genus Criorhynchus or Ornithocheirus.

As a result of the reappearance of the concept European workers referred many species discovered in South-America to Coloborhynchus, a practice rejected by most South-American researchers. In 2009 a study by the Brazilian paleontologists Taissa Rodrigues and Alexander Kellner concluded that Coloborhynchus comprised only a single species, its type species, C. clavirostris. Accordingly, in the same publication they created a new genus for C. wadleighi: Uktenadactylus. The genus name is derived from Uktena, a giant horned snake from the mythology of the Cherokee and Greek daktylos, "finger", a common element in the names of pterosaurs since Pterodactylus, referring to their typical wing finger.

=== Formerly assigned species ===
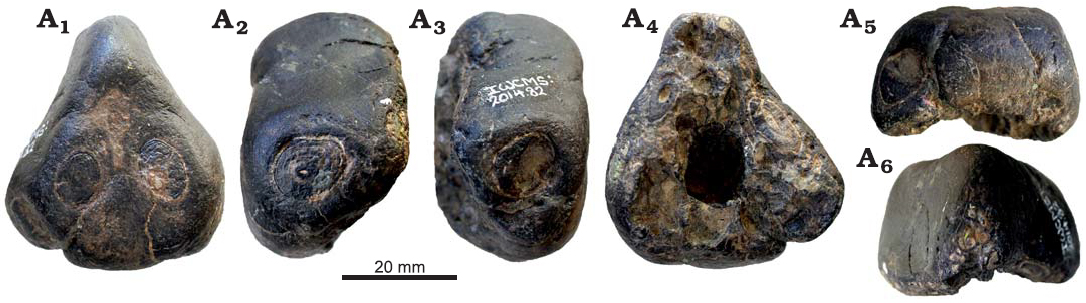
Tylodorhynchus holotype

In 2020, Borja Holgado and Rubi Pêgas named a new species of Uktenadactylus, U. rodriguesae after Rodrigues, known from a snout fragment (cataloged as IWCMS 2014.82) found on the Isle of Wight. This specimen had previously been described in 2015 by David Martill as an indeterminate member of the genus Coloborhynchus on account of the anteriorly-projecting teeth at the snout tip. Holgado and Pêgas recognized that it shared features with U. wadleighi, and thus assigned it as a new species in the same genus. In 2026, Pêgas and Holgado published a revised description of this species and assigned it to a new genus, Tylodorhynchus.

== Description ==
The holotype and only specimen of U. wadleighi, the partial snout, has a length of about fifteen centimetres and consists of the front end of the skull, containing the premaxilla (cranial bone at the tip of the upper jaw) and a small part of the maxilla (upper jaw). On top the base of a crest is present, gradually curving upwards and ending at a height of 7.5 centimeters (3.0 in), having attained at that point a thickness of 4 millimeters (0.16 in). The snout broadens towards the front. On the left side eight tooth sockets or alveoli are visible, on the right side six. The first pair of teeth was located in the flat tip of the snout, pointing forwards. The alveoli at first increase in size from the tip towards the back, the third pair being the largest with a diameter of either 17.6 millimeters (0.69 in) or 17.7 millimeters (0.70 in). The fourth pair is much smaller; to the back gradually the tooth sockets again increase in size. According to Rodrigues and Kellner the species has two unique traits: the presence of an oval depression above and in between the first pair of teeth and of a ventral medial depression between the second pair of teeth, a circular hollow positioned on the lower edge of the snout tip that Lee had interpreted as a possible pneumatic foramen. The holotype of Tylodorhynchus, then referred to U. rodriguesae, was initially described as similar to the holotype of U. wadleighi, sharing the oval depression and also a bulbous projection on the palate. However, it differs from U. wadleighi in that the depression is shallower, the second pair of teeth projects more laterally, and the margins of the deltoid facet (an upturned region of the front palate) are concave as opposed to straight; the projection on the palate is also sharp in U. wadleighi unlike the bulbous projection in Tylodorhynchus.

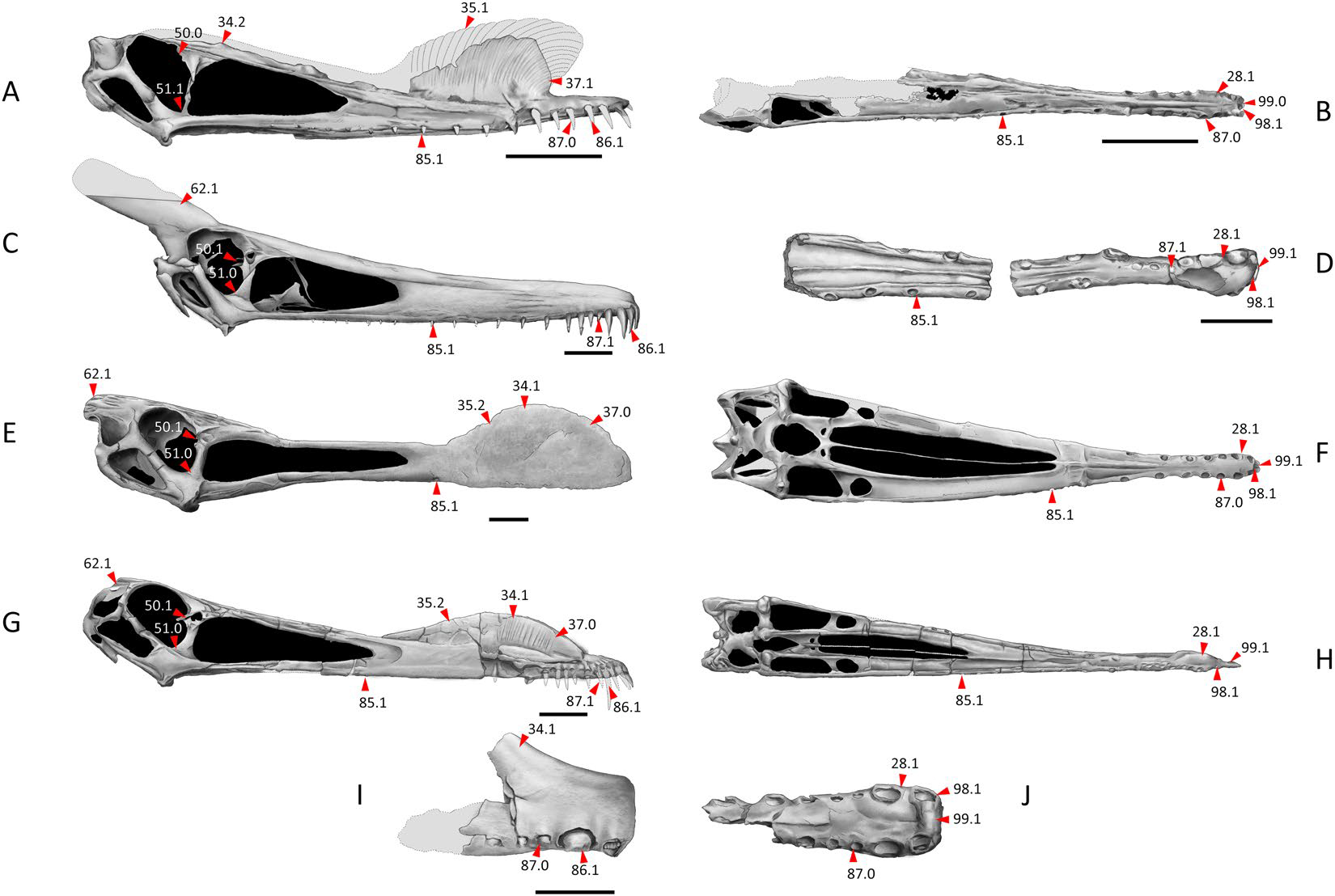
U. wadleighi holotype (I, J) compared with other anhanguerians

Rodrigues and Kellner base the distinction between Uktenadactylus and Coloborhynchus clavirostris on several stratigraphical, methodological and phylogenetic considerations. There is a possible age difference of perhaps over thirty million years between the Berriasian-Valanginian British and the younger Albian-Cenomanian American form. Because both taxa are based on very limited remains, that however, even within these limits are clearly distinguishable on the species level, they reject a rash assumption of generic identity. Also the uncertain affinity with the closely related form Siroccopteryx would make such an assumption problematical. Rodrigues and Kellner identified that both Uktenadactylus and Coloborhynchus clavirostris had extremely enlarged second and third pairs of teeth, but Uktenadactylus had a more forward position of the crest than that of C. clavirostris, beginning at the very tip of the snout, and a deeper palatal groove and shallow grooves running parallel to the ridge of the front part of the palate; a depression is located below the first alveoli and the second, third and fourth tooth pairs had a more lateral position, whereas the fifth and sixth pair are much closer to the midline of the skull. Both genera share some derived traits with Siroccopteryx, having larger second and third teeth pairs than the fourth, flat tip of the snout, similarly thick crest at the very front of the upper jaw, and quadrangular expansion of the upper jaw. The authors conclude from these similarities that the three taxa likely formed an, as yet unnamed, clade together within the Anhangueridae.

== Classification ==
In 2013, a topology by Andres & Myers placed Uktenadactylus within the family Ornithocheiridae, as the sister taxon of Coloborhynchus clavirostris, though in the analysis, Uktenadactylus was identified as Coloborhynchus wadleighi. In 2019, a slightly different topology by Jacobs et al. also recovered Uktenadactylus within the Ornithocheiridae, but as the sister taxon of several Coloborhynchus species, and identified with its current name. Their cladogram is shown on the left. However, many subsequent analyses in the same year as well as in 2020 have recovered Uktenadactylus within the family Anhangueridae, more specifically within the subfamily Coloborhynchinae. The cladogram on the right is a topology based on the phylogenetic analysis made by Borja Holgado and Rubi Pêgas in 2020, where they recovered Uktenadactylus as the sister taxon of Nicorhynchus within the Coloborhynchinae.

Topology 1: Jacobs et al. (2019).

- Ornithocheirae
  - Anhangueridae
  - Ornithocheiridae
    - - - Coloborhynchus clavirostris
        - - Uktenadactylus wadleighi
          - - Coloborhynchus reedi
            - Coloborhynchus capito
            - - Coloborhynchus fluviferox
              - Coloborhynchus NHMUK R481
    - - - - Siroccopteryx moroccensis
          - - Ornithocheirus simus
            - Tropeognathus mesembrinus
        - - Camposipterus segwickii
          - Camposipterus colorhinus
          - - Camposipterus nasutus
            - - Cimoliopterus cuvieri
              - Cimoliopterus dunni

Topology 2: Holgado & Pêgas (2020).

- Anhangueridae
  - Tropeognathinae
    - - Siroccopteryx
      - Tropeognathus
    - - Mythunga
      - Ferrodraco
  - Coloborhynchinae
    - Aerodraco
    - - Coloborhynchus
      - - Nicorhynchus
        - Uktenadactylus
  - Anhanguerinae
    - - Caulkicephalus
      - Guidraco
      - Ludodactylus
    - - Liaoningopterus
      - - Cearadactylus
        - Maaradactylus
      - Anhanguera

== See also ==
- List of pterosaur genera
- Timeline of pterosaur research
