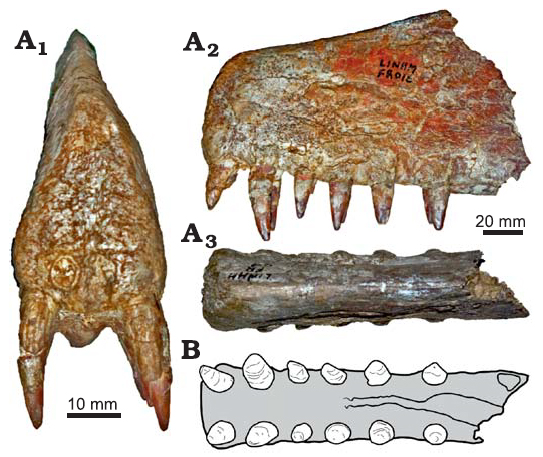
- Holotype snout fragment

Scientific classification
- Kingdom: Animalia
- Phylum: Chordata
- Class: Reptilia
- Order: †Pterosauria
- Suborder: †Pterodactyloidea
- Family: †Anhangueridae
- Subfamily: †Tropeognathinae
- Genus: †Siroccopteryx; Mader & Kellner, 1999

Type species
- †Siroccopteryx moroccensis Mader & Kellner, 1999

Synonyms
- Coloborhynchus moroccensis (Mader & Kellner, 1999)

= Siroccopteryx =

Siroccopteryx Temporal range: Cenomanian

Genus of anhanguerid pterosaur from the Early Cretaceous

Siroccopteryx is an extinct genus of anhanguerid pterodactyloid pterosaur which lived in Morocco during the Cenomanian stage of the Late Cretaceous. Some researchers, such as David M. Unwin, consider the genus a junior synonym of Coloborhynchus.

== Description ==
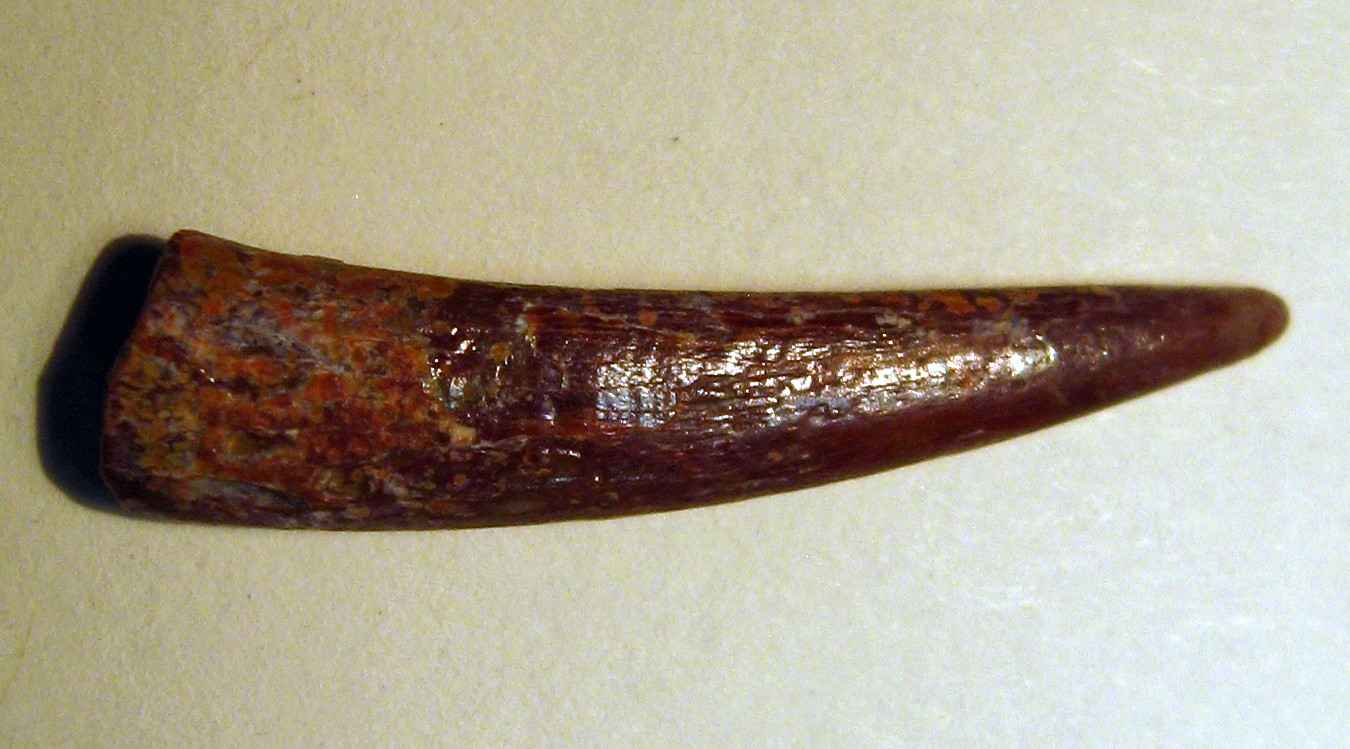
Possible tooth

The genus was named and described in 1999 by Bryn Mader and Alexander Kellner. The name Siroccopteryx means "wing of the Sirocco", referring to the warm wind that originates in the North Africa and then goes through the Mediterranean, and the Greek word pteryx, a standard suffix for pterosaur genera that means "wing". The epithet of the type species S. moroccensis refers to its country of origin.

This pterosaur is known only from the front part of the jaw with teeth. The holotype fossil, LINHM 016 (Long Island Natural History Museum), was found near Ksar es Souk, in the province of Errachidia in the region of Meknes-Tafilalet at 30.4 ° N, 4.9 ° longitude (17.6 ° N, 4.2 ° W longitude) in Beg'aa, west of Hamada du Guiren in southeastern Morocco, in a layer of red sandstone, a fine-grained alluvium from the Albian to Cenomanian. It consists of front teeth and a snout that's not compressed. The muzzle was long and narrow, with a large elongated terminal part, along with some sort of crest shaped anterior keel higher than that of Anhanguera but not as high as that of Coloborhynchus or Tropeognathus. The teeth were sharp but short and more robust than in Anhanguera. The bone is rough and leathery, with strange marks of wrinkles and depressions, this may be a consequence of the conditions of preservation, but the descriptors suggest that it indicates a disease, possibly caused by dental abscesses. According to André Veldmeijer, it is probable that this damage was post-mortem and that it indicates the presence of a keratinous cover on the ridge.

The wingspan of this large pterosaur was estimated to be 4 to 5 meters (13 to 16 ft). It is likely that this animal was a specialized glider, and ventured into the sea off the coast of Africa, to capture fishes that swam near the surface.

== Phylogeny ==
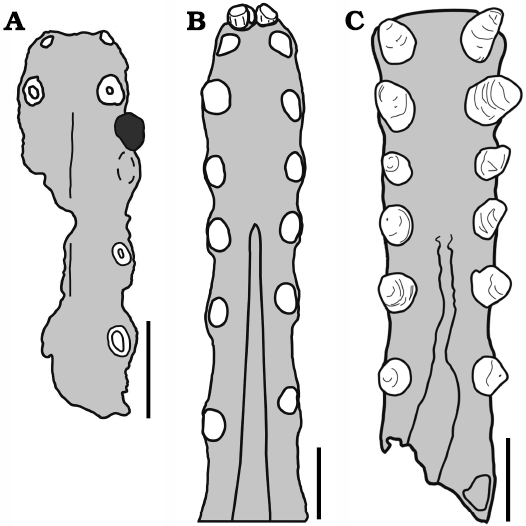
Palate of Siroccopteryx (C) compared to the palates of Ferrodraco (A) and Tropeognathus (B), all of them are in occlusal view

The descriptors of Siroccopteryx placed this genus in the family Anhangueridae sensu Kellner. David Unwin suggested in 2001 that it was a species of Coloborhynchus, and thus a member of the Ornithocheiridae. This has been controversial. In the same year, Michael Fastnacht suggested it was closer to Anhanguera. Kellner and Rodrigues (2009) considered Siroccopteryx a distinct genus, and suggested that it formed a clade with Coloborhynchus clavirostris and Uktenadactylus.

In 2018, a topology recovered by Longrich et al. assigned Siroccopteryx to the family Ornithocheiridae as the sister taxon of Coloborhynchus. In 2019 however, Jacobs et al. published an analysis that also recovers Siroccopteryx within the family Ornithocheiridae, but they concluded that it would have been more closely related to, and therefore the sister taxon of both Ornithocheirus and Tropeognathus, which contradicts the conclusion of Siroccopteryx being more closely related to Coloborhynchus. In 2020, a study made by Borja Holgado and Rubi Pêgas again recovered Siroccopteryx as the sister taxon to Tropeognathus, however, they assigned both genera to the family Anhangueridae instead of the Ornithocheiridae.

Topology 1: Jacobs et al. (2019).

- Ornithocheirae
  - Anhangueridae
  - Ornithocheiridae
    - - Coloborhynchus clavirostris
      - - Uktenadactylus wadleighi
        - - Coloborhynchus reedi
          - Coloborhynchus capito
          - - Coloborhynchus fluviferox
            - Coloborhynchus NHMUK R481
    - - - Siroccopteryx moroccensis
        - - Ornithocheirus simus
          - Tropeognathus mesembrinus
      - - Camposipterus segwickii
        - Camposipterus colorhinus
        - - Camposipterus nasutus
          - - Cimoliopterus cuvieri
            - Cimoliopterus dunni

Topology 2: Holgado & Pêgas (2020).

- Anhangueridae
  - Tropeognathinae
    - - Siroccopteryx
      - Tropeognathus
    - - Mythunga
      - Ferrodraco
  - Coloborhynchinae
    - Aerodraco
    - - Coloborhynchus
      - - Nicorhynchus
        - Uktenadactylus
  - Anhanguerinae
    - - Caulkicephalus
      - Guidraco
      - Ludodactylus
    - - Liaoningopterus
      - - Cearadactylus
        - Maaradactylus
      - Anhanguera

== See also ==
- List of pterosaur genera
- Timeline of pterosaur research
