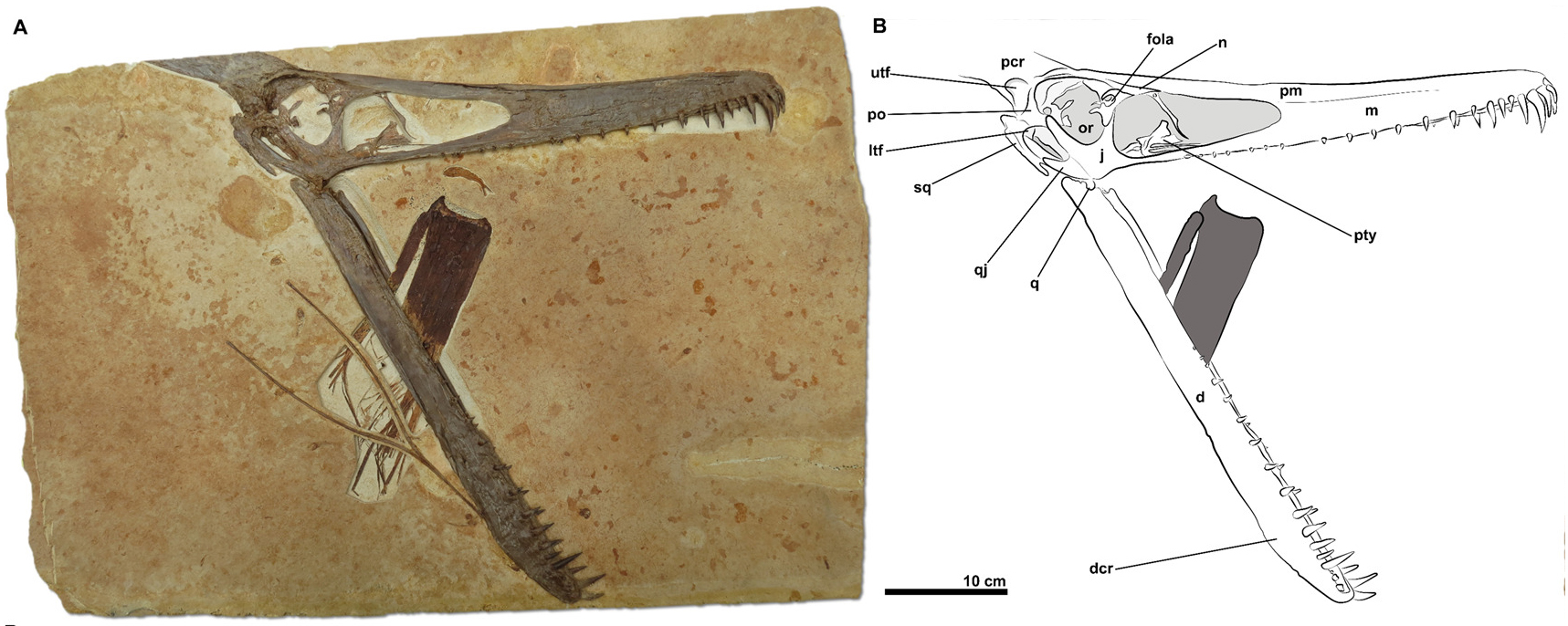
- Holotype skull with diagram of same, including yucca leaf

Scientific classification
- Kingdom: Animalia
- Phylum: Chordata
- Order: †Pterosauria
- Suborder: †Pterodactyloidea
- Family: †Anhangueridae
- Subfamily: †Anhanguerinae
- Genus: †Ludodactylus; Frey et al. 2003

Type species
- †Ludodactylus sibbicki Frey et al. 2003

= Ludodactylus =

Ludodactylus Temporal range: Aptian ~112 Ma

Genus of anhanguerid pterosaur from the Early Cretaceous

Ludodactylus (meaning "play finger") is a genus of anhanguerid pterodactyloid pterosaur from the Early Cretaceous period (Aptian stage) of what is now the Crato Formation of the Araripe Basin in Ceará, Brazil. The type and only species is L. sibbicki. The generic name Ludodactylus refers to the fact that the animal had the combination of teeth and a Pteranodon-like head crest, similar to many toy pterosaurs, and no such creature was known to exist until the discovery of Ludodactylus. However, Ludodactylus is not the only pterosaur now known to possess these features, its very close relative Caulkicephalus is another example.

== History ==
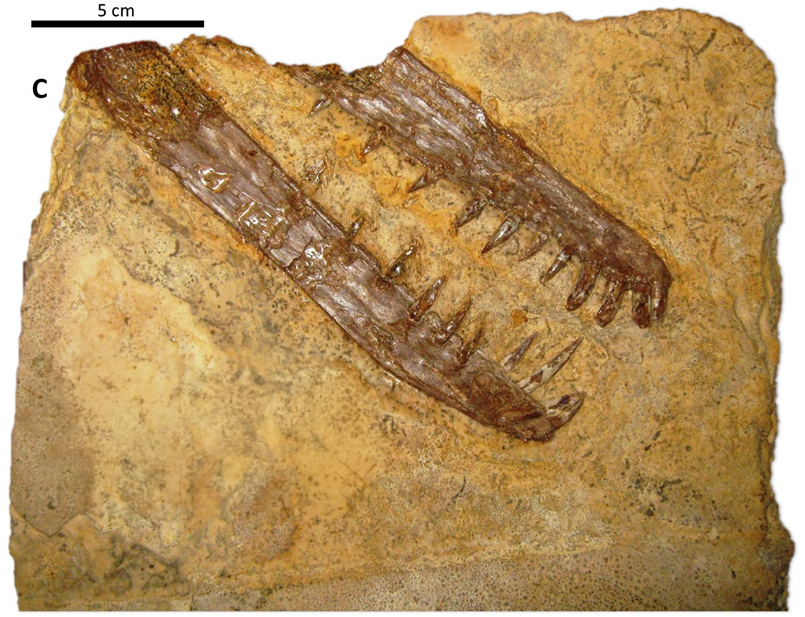
Assigned jaws

The genus was named by Eberhard Frey et al. in 2003 and contains one known species, Ludodactylus sibbicki. The name is derived from Latin ludus, "play" and Greek daktylos, "finger". Ludus refers to the fact, long lamented by paleontologists, that many toy pterosaurs combined teeth with a Pteranodon-like head crest, while no such creature was known to exist — however, Ludodactylus shows exactly this combination of features. "Dactylus", in reference to the characteristic long wing finger, has been a common element in the names of pterosaurs, since the first known genus was named Pterodactylus. The specific name "sibbicki" is an homage to the paleoartist John Sibbick.

== Description ==
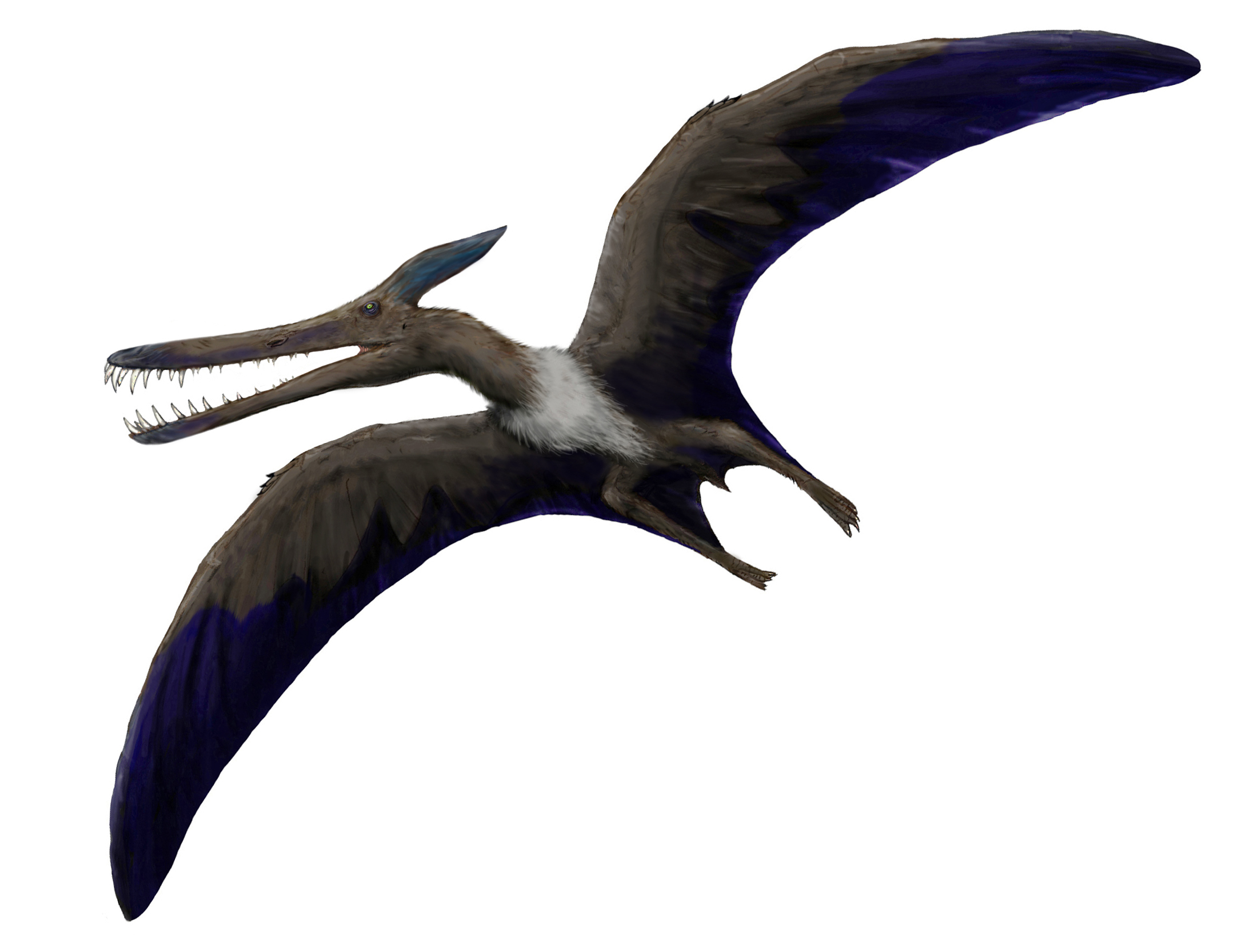
Life restoration

Ludodactylus is based on holotype SMNK PAL 3828, a skull missing part of the head crest, that was removed from the plate before the fossil was illegally sold. Unlike other ornithocheirids (the group of which Ludodactylus was originally assigned to), it had no premaxillary crest on the snout, but did have a crest at the back of the skull. Frey et al. interpreted the deep mandible as a crest on the lower jaws. Trapped between the rami of the mandible is a yucca leaf; Frey suggested that the animal got it caught in its beak and unsuccessfully tried to dislodge it (the edge of the leaf is frayed), and then possibly died from starvation or a complication of starving. The skull would have been more than 66 centimeters (26 in) long.

== Classification ==
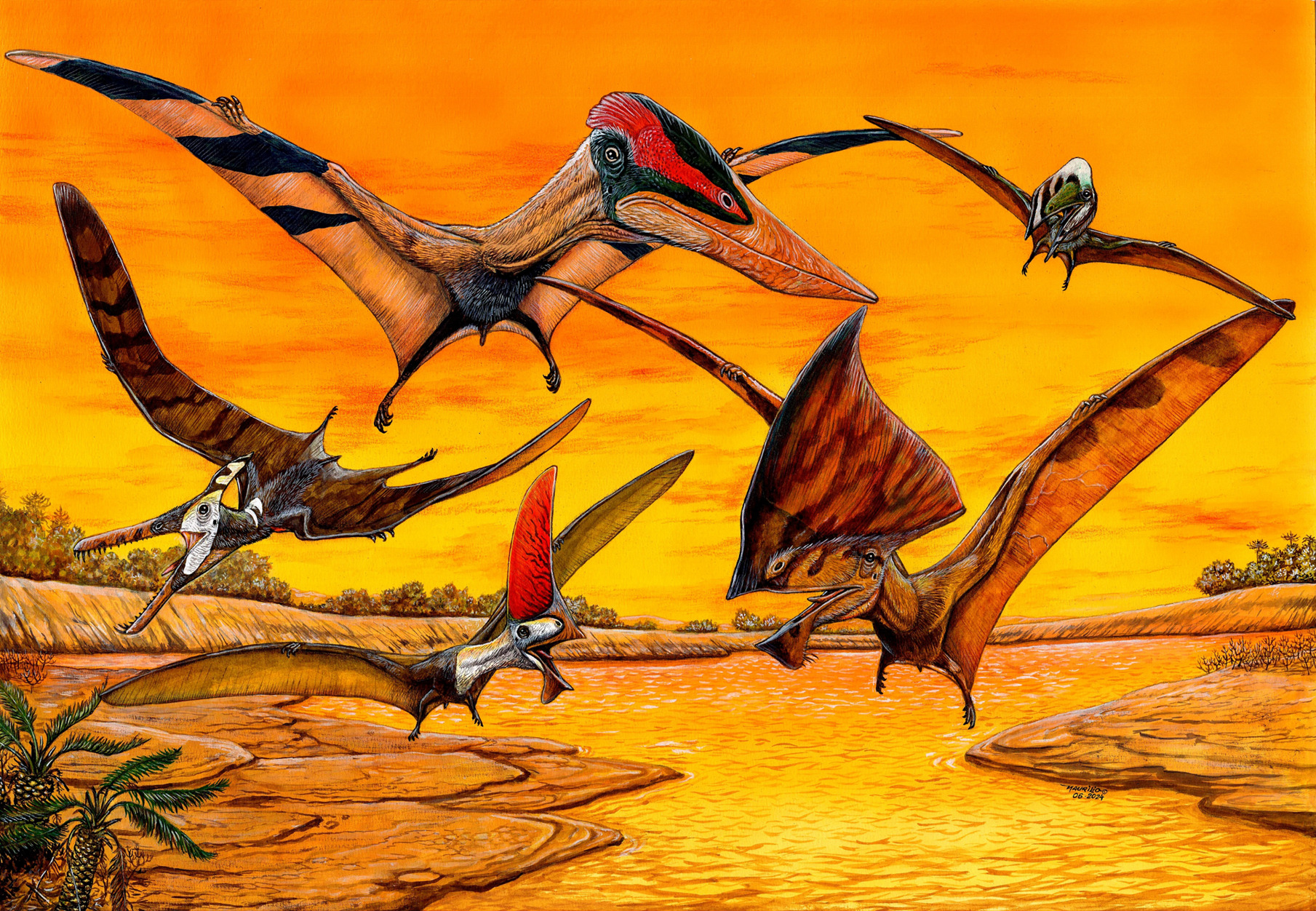
Life restorations of Ludodactylus (middle left) and other pterosaurs known from the Crato Formation

In 2003, Frey et al. classified Ludodactylus in the family Ornithocheiridae. In 2007, Frey had reconsidered the validity of Ludodactylus, suggesting that it may represent the same animal as Brasileodactylus, and therefore a junior synonym. In 2014 however, Brian Andres and colleagues, in a large cladistic analysis of pterosaurs, found Ludodactylus to be slightly more closely related to ornithocheirids and anhanguerids than to Brasileodactylus. In the analysis of Andres and colleagues, Ludodactylus is classified just outside Ornithocheiridae and Anhangueridae as a derived member of the more inclusive group Anhangueria. Their cladogram is shown on the left. In 2020, a different topology by Borja Holgado and Rubi Pêgas recovered Ludodactylus within the family Anhangueridae, more specifically to the subfamily Anhanguerinae, sister taxon to both Caulkicephalus and Guidraco. This proves that it is indeed very closely related to the anhanguerids. Their cladogram is shown on the right.

Topology 1: Andres et al. (2014).

- Anhangueria
  - Boreopteridae
    - Guidraco
    - Boreopterinae
      - Boreopterus
      - Zhenyuanopterus
  - - Cearadactylus
    - - Brasileodactylus
      - - Ludodactylus
        - Ornithocheirae
          - Anhangueridae
            - Liaoningopterus
            - Anhanguera
          - Ornithocheiridae
            - Tropeognathus
            - Ornithocheirinae
              - Coloborhynchus
              - Ornithocheirus

Topology 2: Holgado & Pêgas (2020).

- Anhangueridae
  - Tropeognathinae
    - - Siroccopteryx
      - Tropeognathus
    - - Mythunga
      - Ferrodraco
  - Coloborhynchinae
    - Aerodraco
    - - Coloborhynchus
      - - Nicorhynchus
        - Uktenadactylus
  - Anhanguerinae
    - - Caulkicephalus
      - Guidraco
      - Ludodactylus
    - - Liaoningopterus
      - - Cearadactylus
        - Maaradactylus
      - Anhanguera

== See also ==
- List of pterosaur genera
- Timeline of pterosaur research
