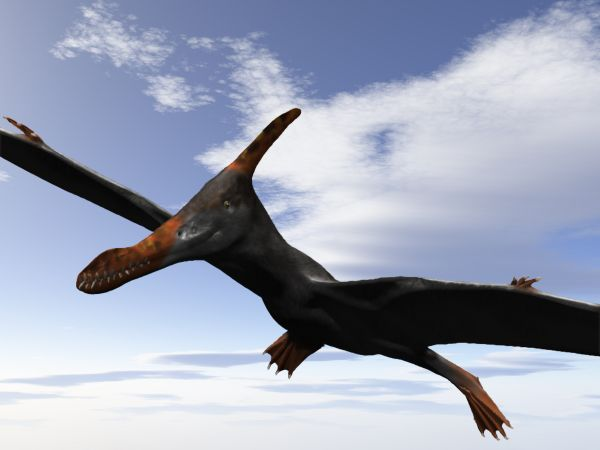
- Life restoration of Caulkicephalus

Scientific classification
- Kingdom: Animalia
- Phylum: Chordata
- Order: †Pterosauria
- Suborder: †Pterodactyloidea
- Family: †Anhangueridae
- Subfamily: †Anhanguerinae
- Genus: †Caulkicephalus; Steel et al., 2005
- Species: †C. trimicrodon

Binomial name
- †Caulkicephalus trimicrodon Steel et al., 2005

= Caulkicephalus =

Caulkicephalus Temporal range: Early Cretaceous, 125 Ma

Genus of anhanguerid pterosaur from the Early Cretaceous

Caulkicephalus is a genus of anhanguerid pterosaur from the Isle of Wight off the coast of England. It lived during the Early Cretaceous period, about 125 million years ago.

== Discovery and naming ==
Between 1995 and 2003, bone fragments of an unknown pterosaur were found at the Yaverland locality near Sandown. The discoveries were made in or from a brown clay layer from the Wessex Formation of the Wealden Group, stemming from the Early Cretaceous (Barremian age, about 125 million years ago).

In 2005 a new genus was named and described by Lorna Steel, David Martill, David Unwin and John Winch. The type species is Caulkicephalus trimicrodon. The genus name is a translation of "Caulkhead", a traditional nickname for Isle of Wight residents, partially derived from the Greek kephale, "head". The specific name, trimicrodon, means "three small teeth", in reference to the dentition.

== Description ==
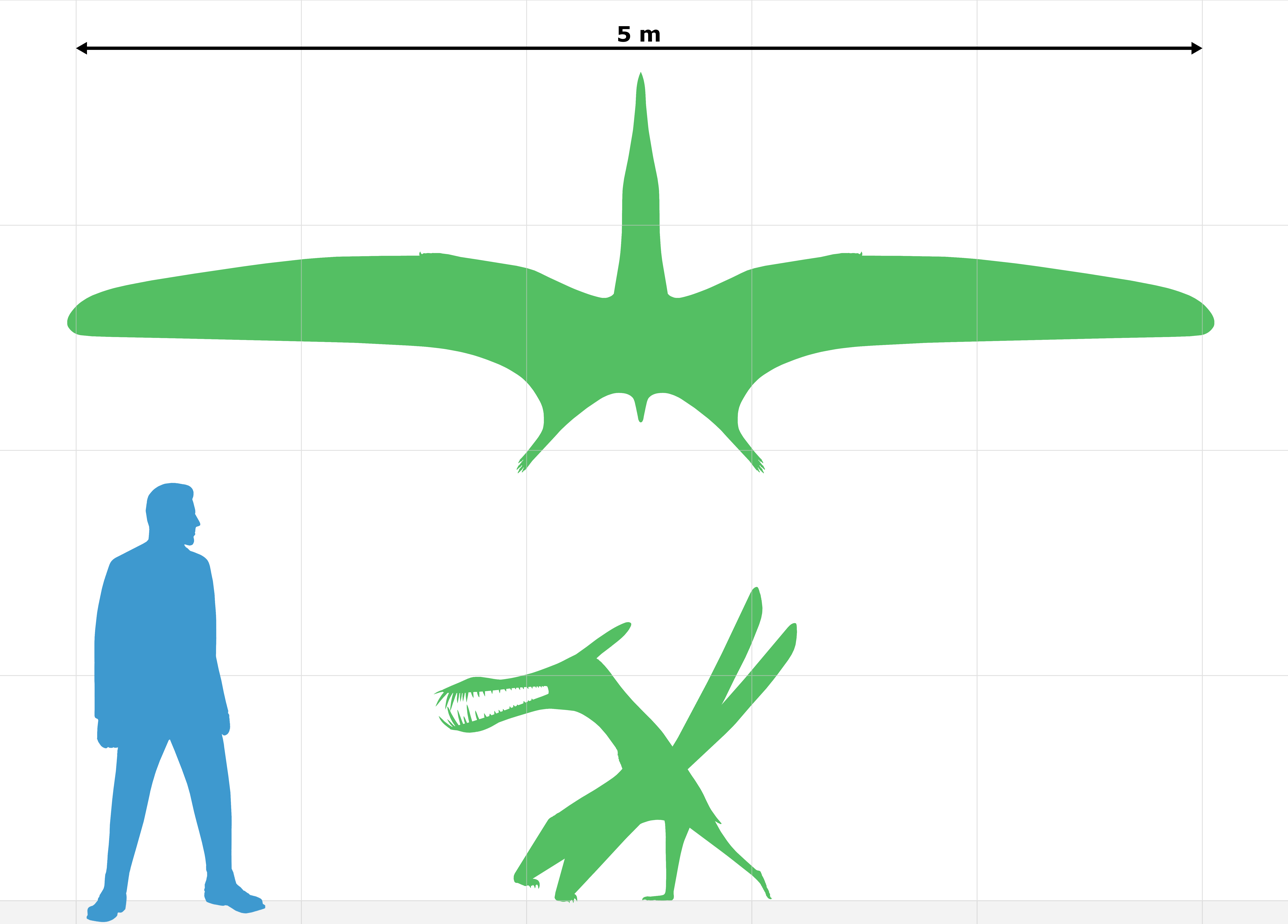
C.trimicrodon with a human for scale

The holotype is IWCMS 2002.189.1, 2, 4: three pieces, more or less contiguous, of the front part of a snout. As paratypes have been referred: IWCMS 2002.189.3, a partial posterior skull roof; IWCMS 2003.2, a left quadrate; IWCMS 2003.4, a possible partial jugal; ICWMS 2002.237, a 44 millimeter (1.7 in) long fragment of the first phalanx of the wing finger; IWCMS 2002.234.1-4, four contiguous fragments of a first phalanx, together measuring 245 millimeters (9.6 in) long; IWCMS 2002.233, a possible distal end, 64 millimeters (2.5 in) long, of a second phalanx; IWCMS 2002.236, a fragment of the shaft of possibly the fourth phalanx; and IWCMS 2003.3, a probable fragment of a hindlimb bone. The fossils have only been slightly compressed.

The snout fragments have a combined length of 290 millimeters (11 in). On the snout top the base of a crest is visible, not quite reaching its rounded tip. The teeth have, apart from some replacement teeth present deep in the jaw, been lost but their number, orientation and size can be inferred from the tooth sockets, which however are partly missing at the right side. These are oval and slightly elevated above the jaw bone. The first two tooth pairs were pointed somewhat to the front; the teeth more to the back pointed more sideways; the most posterior preserved stood perpendicular to the jaw. The teeth increased in size until the third pair which was the largest. The fourth pair was equal to the first but the fifth, sixth and seventh pairs were markedly smaller, less than half in size; it is this feature which is recalled by the specific name. Pairs eight, nine and ten again equalled the first. After a narrow hiatus between the second and third snout fragment four tooth sockets are present at each side of the latter, but these are not placed in opposite pairs. The number of teeth in the upper jaw thus seems to have been at least fourteen.

The smaller sized teeth were placed in a constriction of the snout, which thus had a broader end with larger teeth, a so-called "prey grab", usually interpreted as an adaptation to catch slippery prey such as fish.

The posterior skull fragment, a braincase which is rather damaged, shows on its top the base of a parietal crest, probably pointing towards the back. It seems to have been separate from the snout crest.

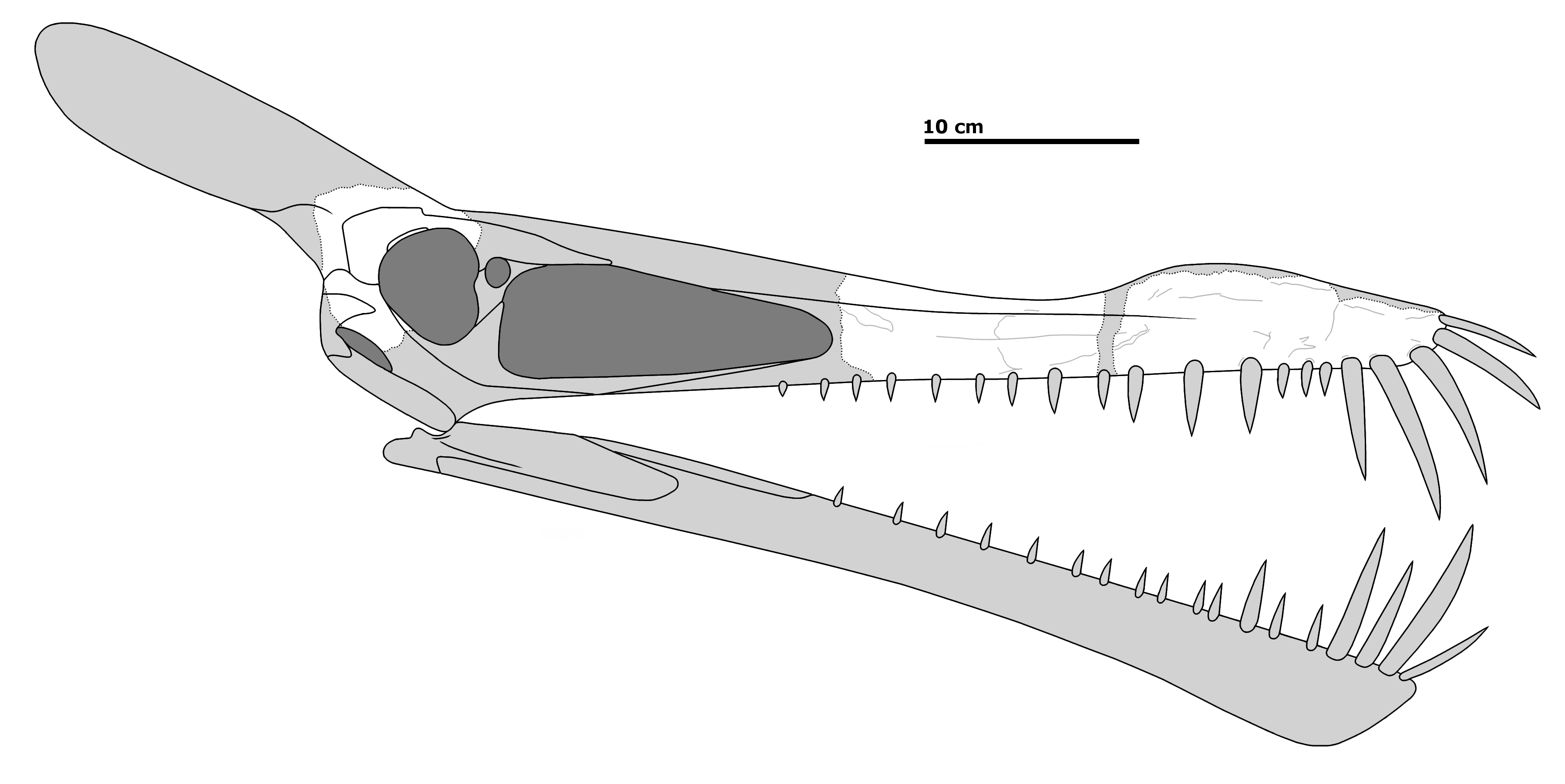
Skull reconstruction, showing known areas in white

The layer the fossils were found in, does not consist of marine sediments, but contains land plant debris; this is seen as an indication of a more terrestrial habitat. David Martill estimated Caulkicephalus had a wingspan of around 5 meters (16.5 ft).

== Classification ==
Caulkicephalus was by the describers assigned to the Ornithocheiridae in view of the narrowing in the middle of the snout. The snout crest was seen as an indication it belonged to the more general Ornithocheiroidea sensu Unwin, whereas the parietal crest was suggested to have been a synapomorphy, a shared new feature, of the more narrow group of the Euornithocheira. Unique characters of the species itself, its autapomorphies, are the details of its dentition, the downward and backward running suture between the premaxilla and maxilla, and the fact the median ridge of the palate begins (or ends) at the ninth tooth pair.

In 2019 however, several studies have reassigned Caulkicephalus to the family Anhangueridae, specifically to the subfamily Anhanguerinae, sister taxon to both Guidraco and Ludodactylus. The cladogram below is a topology recovered by Rubi Pêgas and colleagues in 2019, showing the position of Caulkicephalus within the Anhangueridae.

- Anhangueria
  - Hamipteridae
    - Hamipterus
    - Iberodactylus
  - Anhangueridae
    - Tropeognathus
    - Coloborhynchinae
      - Coloborhynchus
      - Siroccopteryx
      - Uktenadactylus
    - Anhanguerinae
      - - Caulkicephalus
        - Guidraco
        - Ludodactylus
      - - Anhanguera
        - Liaoningopterus
        - - Cearadactylus
          - Maaradactylus

== See also ==
- List of pterosaur genera
- Timeline of pterosaur research
- Pterosaur size
