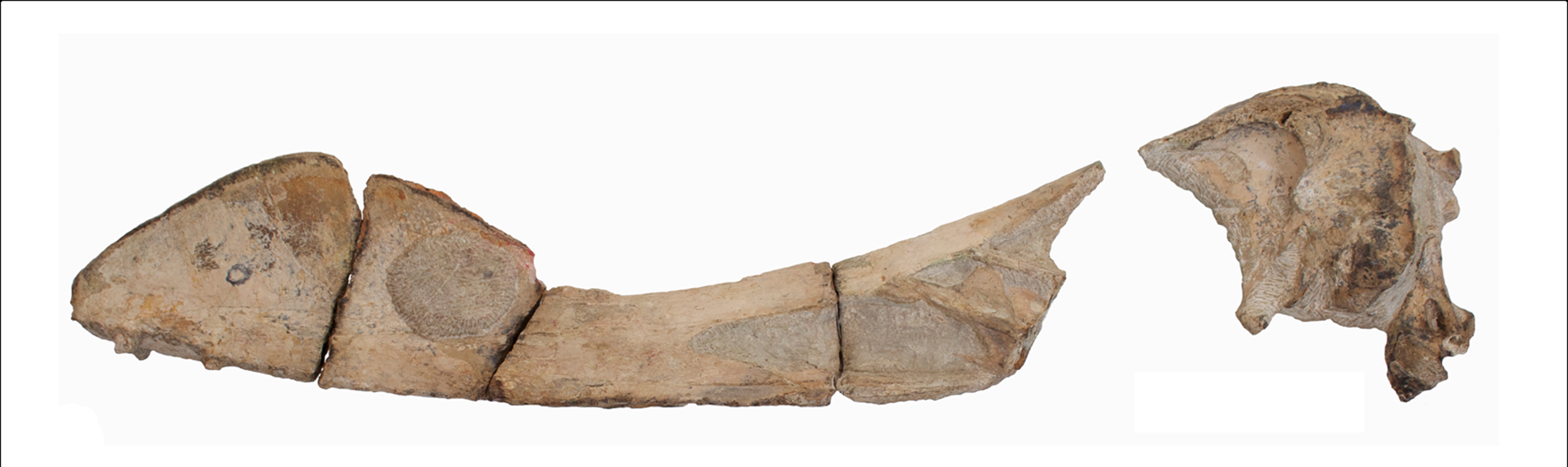
- Holotype specimen of Maaradactylus, MPSC R 2357

Scientific classification
- Kingdom: Animalia
- Phylum: Chordata
- Class: Reptilia
- Order: †Pterosauria
- Suborder: †Pterodactyloidea
- Family: †Anhangueridae
- Subfamily: †Anhanguerinae
- Genus: †Maaradactylus; Bantim et al., 2014

Type species
- †Maaradactylus kellneri Bantim et al., 2014

= Maaradactylus =

Maaradactylus Temporal range: Aptian–Albian

Genus of anhanguerid pterosaur from the Early Cretaceous

Maaradactylus is a genus of anhanguerid pterodactyloid pterosaur known from the Lower Cretaceous (Aptian to Albian) Romualdo Formation of northeastern Brazil.

== Discovery ==
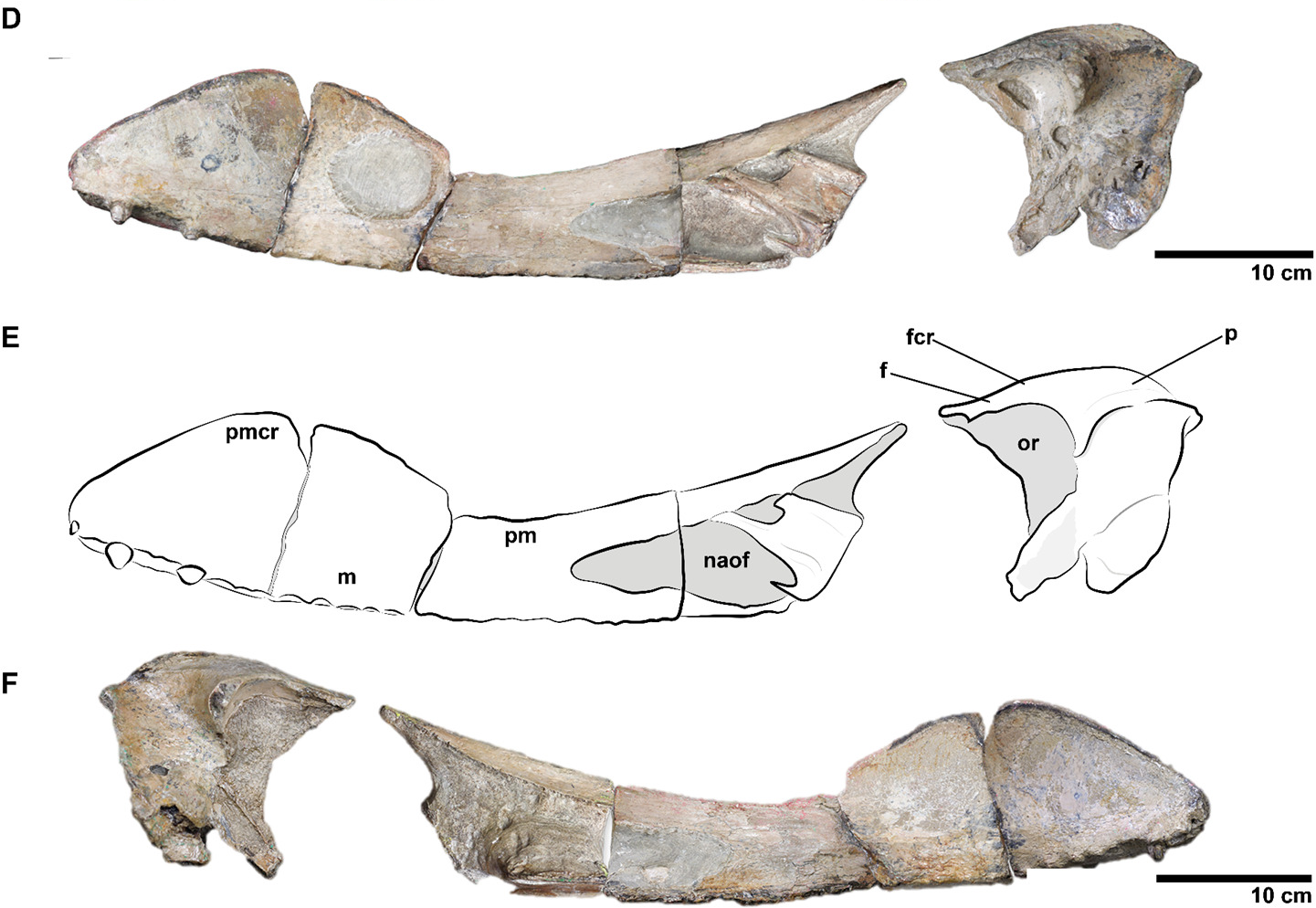
Only known skull of Maaradactylus in left and right view

Maaradactylus is based on the Museu Paleontologico de Santana do Cariri specimen MPSC R 2357, a skull, atlas, and axis discovered in 2010 in the Aptian-Albianaged Romualdo Formation of Sítio São Gonçalo, Santana do Cariri, Ceará, in the Araripe Basin of Brazil.

Maaradactylus was described by Renan Bantim and colleagues in 2014. The type species is Maaradactylus kellneri. The generic name refers to Maara, in the legends of the Cariri the daughter of a chief, by sorcery changed into a river monster with long teeth, devouring fishermen. The suffix ~dactylus is common in the names of pterosaurs and is derived from Greek δάκτυλος, daktylos, "finger", referring to the long (fourth) wing finger. The specific name honors Alexander Kellner, Brazil's foremost pterosaur expert.

In 2019, the species Coloborhynchus spielbergi, also assigned as Anhanguera spielbergi, was reassigned to Maaradactylus by Megan L. Jacobs and colleagues as M. spielbergi. This species was named after the filmmaker Steven Spielberg, the director of Jurassic Park by André J. Veldmeijer. Later studies would retain it in the genus Anhanguera, though it has been noted the taxonomy of Araripe Basin anhanguerids requires further study.

== Description ==
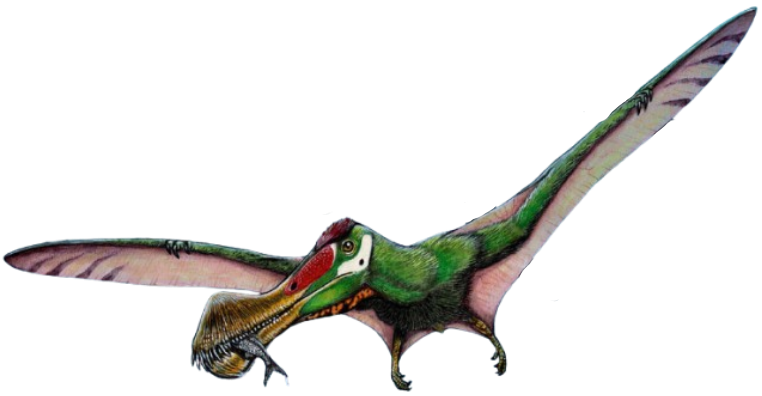
Life restoration of Maaradactylus

A an anhanguerid pterosaur, Maaradactylus would have been a large flying animal with an elongate tooth-filled snout, incredibly elongate wings, and a small torso with small legs and feet. The genus is known only from a skull, which is one of the largest anhanguerid skulls ever discovered at 75 centimetres (30 in) in length. Like many anhanguerids, Maaradactylus possessed a tall, thin crest protruding from the top of the end of the rostrum. Much of the skull, such as the bones around the eye and the robust quadrate bones at the back of the skull, closely resembled those of other anhanguerids such as Anhanguera. It is distinguished from other anhanguerids primarily by its dentition, palate, and crest anatomy.

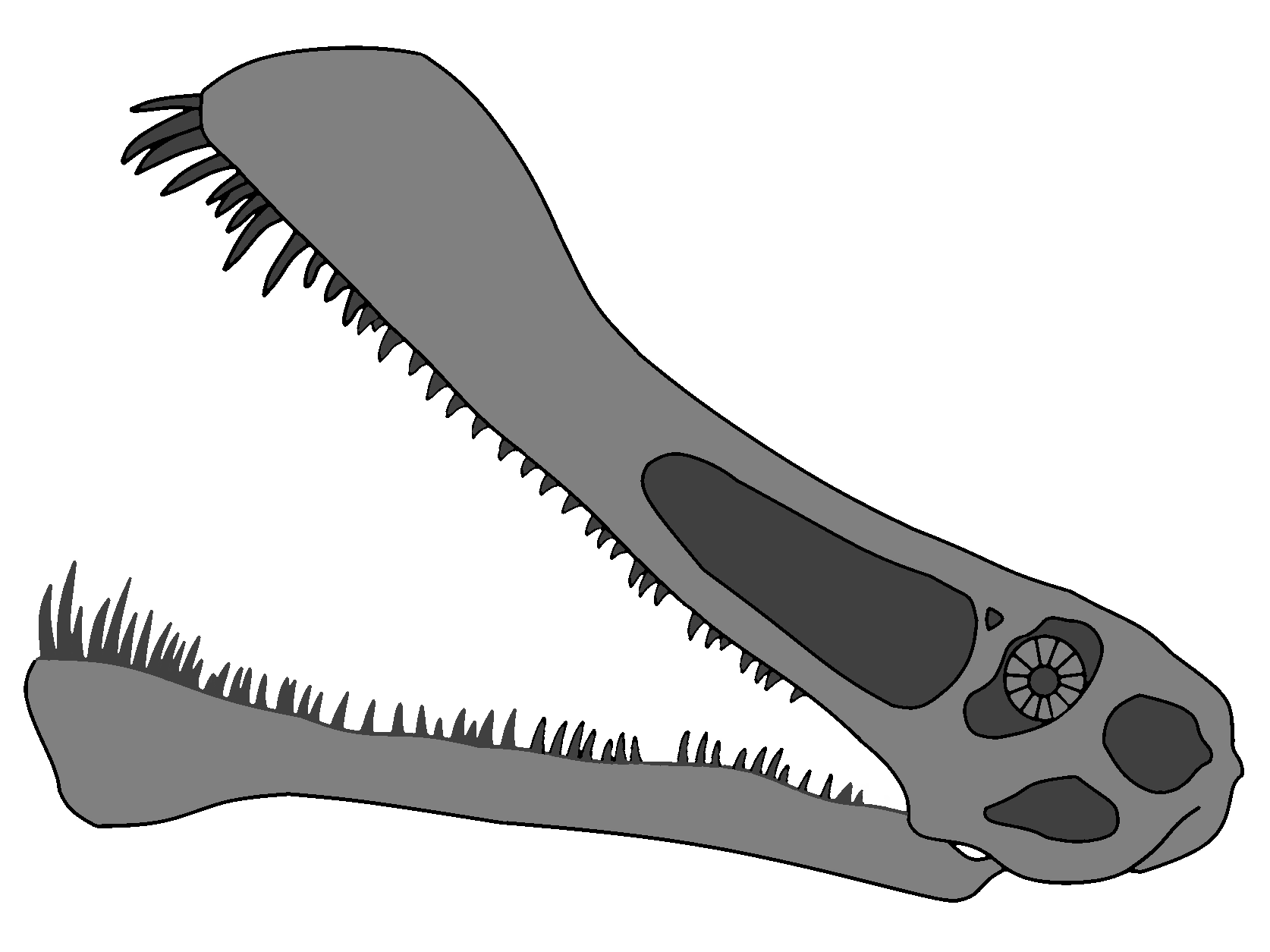
Skull reconstruction, showing extensive dentition; lower jaw and tooth shape is unknown and inferred from relatives

Like many anhanguerids, the end of the long rostrum was expanded to each side, and its front tip had a rounded shape. Similar anatomy is known in other anhanguerines like Anhanguera, but some other anhanguerids (such as tropeognathines) lacked expanded rostrums or (in coloborhynchines and some tropeognathines had blunt tipped snouts. The rostrum of Maaradactylus was particularly expanded, wider than that of Anhanguera. The prominent crest was triangular in shape and around 9.2 centimetres (3.6 in) tall in the only known specimen. It began at the very end of the snout and extended until the 22nd tooth position over the front edge of the nasoantorbital fenestra (a large hole in front of the eyes in all monofenestratan pterosaurs). The crest was similar to that of Tropeognathus in reaching the end of the rostrum, but differed in its longer length and triangular shape. Other anhanguerids such as Anhanguera possessed shorter crests that began further back on the snout. The nasoantorbital fenestra was around 40% of the length of the skull over twice as long as tall. The frontal and parietal bones formed a short crest over the top rear of the head which likely served as a muscle attachment point. It is similarly sized to that of Anhanguera, and unlike the very robust parietal crest of Tropeognathus.

Maaradactylus possessed at least thirty six pairs of teeth in its upper jaw, the most of any anhanguerid pterosaur. Anhanguera blittersdorffi had the closest tooth count at twenty six, and anhanguerids such as Tropeognathus possessed only thirteen. Due to breakage of the maxillae bones in the only known specimen, it cannot be confirmed whether additional teeth were present. Few of the tooth sockets preserve their teeth, but they are known to be elongate in other anhanguerids. As the tip of the jaw as upturned slightly (a trait shared with all other anhangueroids), the small first pair of tooth sockets were elevated above the others and pointed forward. All other teeth pointed downwards. The third and fourth sockets are the largest, whereas the fifth, sixth, and seventh sockets are significantly smaller than both the fourth and eighth. Reduced fifth and sixth teeth is a common trait of anhanguerine anhanguerids, but the seventh tooth additionally being small is otherwise only known in Caulkicephalus. Sockets nine through twelve reduce gradually in size, whereas a gradual increase in size is seen again from sockets thirteen to eighteen. Beyond the eighteen socket, the small rear teeth are arranged in triplets spaced 3–4 centimetres (1.2–1.6 in) apart, a characteristic unique to Maaradactylus. Between the rows of teeth, the roof of the mouth bore a prominent ridge termed the palatal ridge. This ridge extended from between the fifth pair of teeth to between the thirteenth. It was more developed than that of Anhanguera, but less than the robust palatal ridge of Tropeognathus.

== Classification ==
Maaradactylus is recognized as belonging to the family Anhangueridae. This family of toothed pterosaurs is part of the broader lineage of pteranodontoid pterodactyloid pterosaurs known as Ornithocheiriformes which were diverse during the Early Cretaceous period. Some sources instead classify some or all "anhanguerids" under the group Ornithocheiridae. However, some modern phylogenetic studies have found Ornithocheirus to be a distant relative to anhanguerids with superficial similarities, and advocate classifying Maaradactylus and their relatives under the name Anhangueridae.

The placement of Maaradactylus in Anhangueridae was clear upon its original description based on traits such as its large crest and expanded rostrum. A phylogenetic analysis confirmed this, but could not resolve whether it was more closely related to Tropeognathus or Anhanguera. A 2019 phylogenetic analysis by Megan Jacobs and colleagues found Maaradactylus to be the sister taxon (closest relative) of Anhanguera. Analyses by Rubi V. Pêgas, Borja Holgado, and their colleagues have also found it to be closely related to Anhanguera, part of an anhanguerid lineage termed Anhanguerinae distinguished by the small size of their fifth and sixth pairs of teeth. However, these studies find Maaradactylus to be the sister taxon of Cearadactylus. Later work found "Cearadactylus" to be a junior synonym of Brasileodactylus, and a phylogenetic analysis incorporating this found the revised Brasileodactylus as the sister taxon of Maaradactylus. A cladogram depicting the result of a 2025 study by Pêgas are shown below:

- Ornithocheiriformes
  - Ornithocheiridae
    - Thapunngaka
    - - Ornithocheirus
      - Kem Kem ornithocheirid
  - Anhangueroidea
    - Targaryendraconia
    - Anhangueria
      - Hamipteridae
      - Anhangueridae
        - Tropeognathinae
        - - Coloborhynchinae
          - Anhanguerinae
            - - Caulkicephalus
              - - Guidraco
                - Ludodactylus
            - - Liaoningopterus
              - - - Brasileodactylus
                  - Maaradactylus
                - Anhanguera
                  - Anhanguera piscator
                  - Anhanguera spielbergi
                  - Anhanguera blittersdorffi

== See also ==
- List of pterosaur genera
- Timeline of pterosaur research
