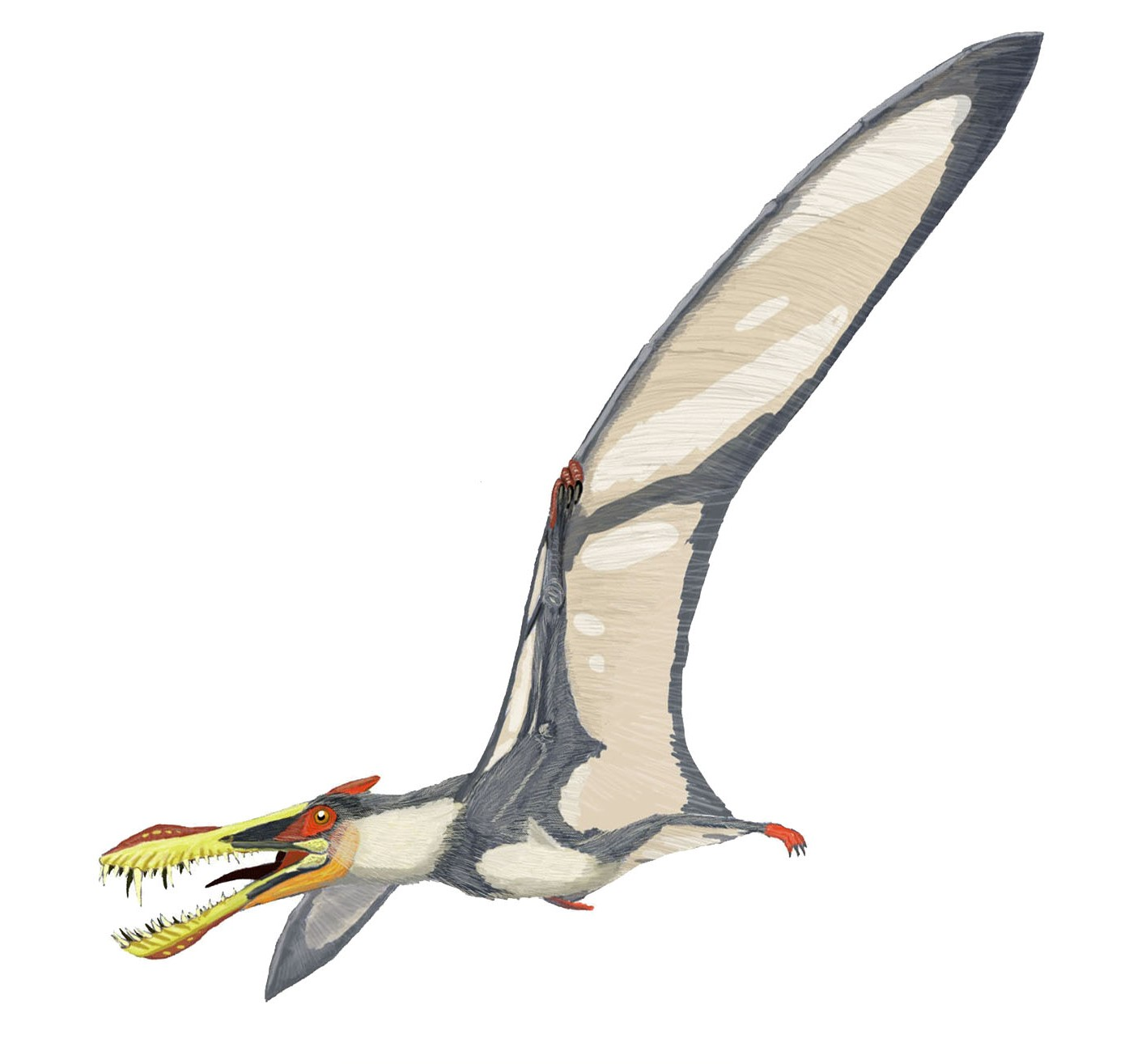
- Hypothetical life restoration

Scientific classification
- Domain: Eukaryota
- Kingdom: Animalia
- Phylum: Chordata
- Order: †Pterosauria
- Suborder: †Pterodactyloidea
- Family: †Anhangueridae
- Subfamily: †Anhanguerinae
- Genus: †Liaoningopterus; Wang & Zhou, 2003

Type species
- †Liaoningopterus gui Wang & Zhou, 2003

= Liaoningopterus =

Liaoningopterus Temporal range: Early Cretaceous, 120 Ma

Genus of anhanguerid pterosaur from the Early Cretaceous

Liaoningopterus, sometimes misspelled as "Liaoningopteryx", was a genus of anhanguerid pterodactyloid pterosaur from the Barremian-Aptian-age Lower Cretaceous Jiufotang Formation of Chaoyang, Liaoning, China.

The genus was named in 2003 by Wang Xiaolin and Zhou Zhonghe. The type species is Liaoningopterus gui. The genus name is derived from Liaoning and a Latinized Greek pteron, "wing". The specific name honors Professor Gu Zhiwei, an invertebrate specialist who has pioneered the study of the Jehol Biota.

== Description ==
The genus is based on holotype IVPP V-13291, a crushed partial skull and skeleton including the jaws, teeth, a cervical vertebra, and bones of the finger supporting the wing. It was a large pterosaur with skull alone estimated at 61 cm (24 in) long, bearing low crests close to the tip of the beak on both lower and upper jaws. The snout crest was 12 centimeters (4.7 in) long, was symmetrical in form and had a maximum height of 17 millimeters (0.67 in). The edge of the upper jaw was very straight. The teeth were only found at the anterior end of the jaws. They were elongated but robust, generally increasing in size from the back to the front. The fourth tooth in the upper jaw is with a length of 81 millimeters (3.2 in), the largest known for any pterosaur. It is exceptional in size compared to the other teeth of Liaoningopterus.

Meanwhile, the longest tooth in the lower jaw of Liaoningopterus has a length of 41 millimeters (1.6 in). Tooth length in the specimen is very variable, which the authors explained by the presence of recently erupted replacement teeth. There were twenty pairs of teeth in the upper jaws and thirteen or fourteen pairs in the lower jaws. The preserved cervical vertebra has a centrum length of 46 millimeters (1.8 in) and a centrum height of 34 millimeters (1.3 in). From the wing bones pieces of the first phalanx can be recognized which had an estimated total length of about 50 millimeters (2.0 in). The authors described Liaoningopterus as being probably a piscivore, due to the long, pointed snout.

The size is estimated at 5 m (16 ft) in wingspan and 20 kg (44 lb) in body mass.

== Classification ==
Wang classified Liaoningopterus as a member of the Anhangueridae, mainly because of the crests. This opinion was restated by him in 2005. In 2006 Lü Junchang published a cladistic analysis showing Liaoningopterus to be a basal member of the Anhangueridae; in 2008 an analysis by Ji Qiang had Liaoningopterus in a trichotomy with Anhanguera and Tropeognathus.

Below is a cladogram showing the phylogenetic placement of this genus within Ornithocheirae from Andres and Myers (2013).

- Ornithocheirae
  - Anhangueridae
    - Liaoningopterus gui
    - Anhanguera
  - Ornithocheiridae
    - Tropeognathus mesembrinus
    - - Ornithocheirus simus
      - - Coloborhynchus clavirostris
        - Coloborhynchus wadleighi

== See also ==
- List of pterosaur genera
- Timeline of pterosaur research
- Pterosaur size
