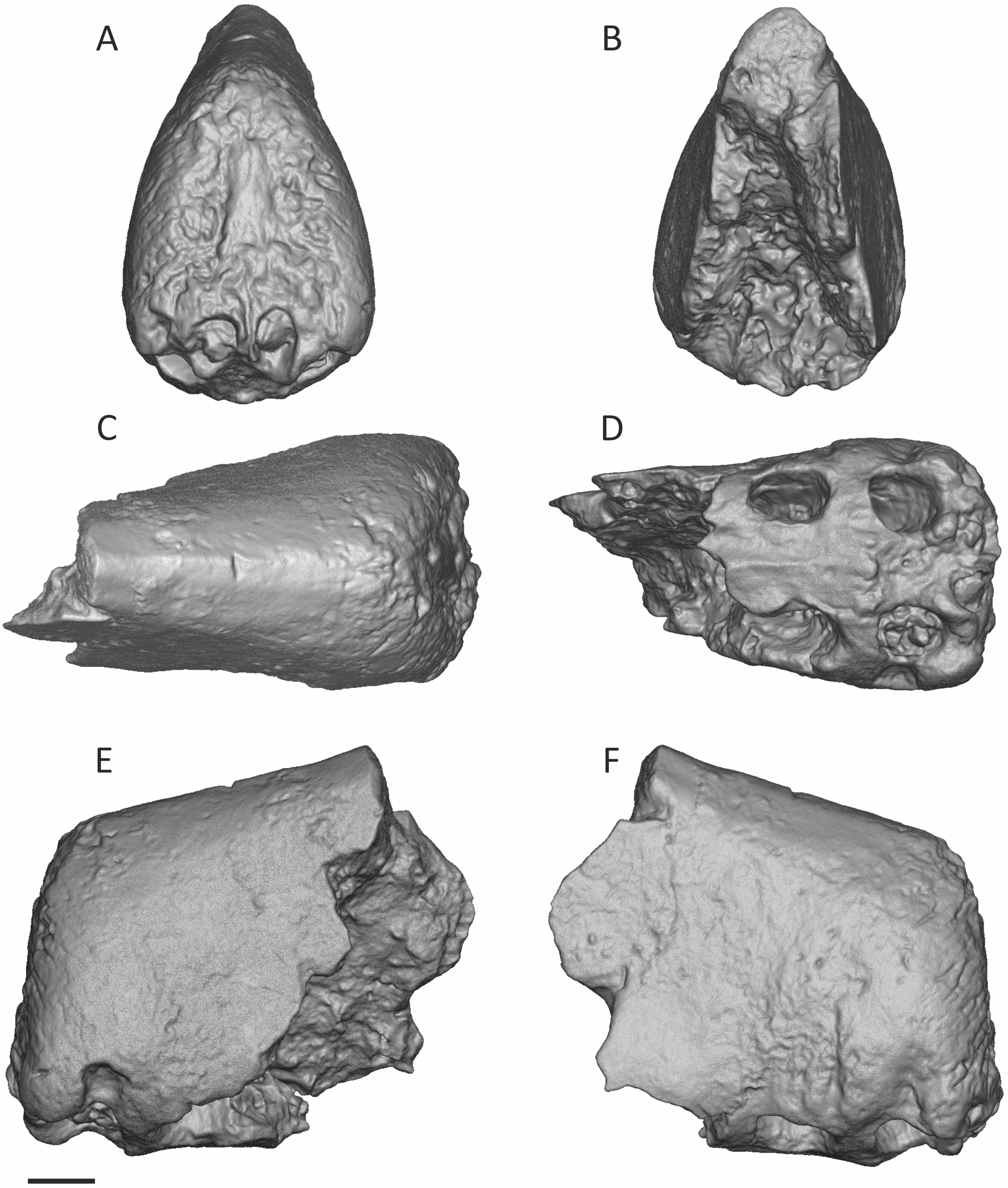
- 3D scan of the holotype

Scientific classification
- Kingdom: Animalia
- Phylum: Chordata
- Class: Reptilia
- Order: †Pterosauria
- Suborder: †Pterodactyloidea
- Family: †Anhangueridae
- Subfamily: †Tropeognathinae
- Genus: †Akharhynchus; Jacobs, Smith & Zouhri, 2024
- Species: †A. martilli

Binomial name
- †Akharhynchus martilli Jacobs, Smith & Zouhri, 2024

= Akharhynchus =

Akharhynchus Temporal range: 'mid'-Cretaceous, ?Albian–Cenomanian

Genus of anhanguerian pterosaurs

Akharhynchus (meaning "another snout") is an extinct genus of tropeognathine pteranodontoid pterosaurs possibly from the Cretaceous Kem Kem Group of Morocco. The genus contains a single species, A. martilli, known from a small fragment of the premaxillae.

== Discovery and naming ==
Fossils of Akharhynchus were first unearthed in an unknown locality near the town of Tafilat in Errachidia Province, southern Morocco. The remains found consist of an isolated premaxilla (upper jaw tip) fragment of a pterosaur, which was found by a commercial fossil dealer who sold it to the Faculté des Sciences Aïn Chock. There it was deposited under specimen number FSAC-KK 12500. Based on the matrix it is preserved in and comparisons with other specimens, it presumably originates from the upper Ifezouane Formation, like many other pterosaurs. The Ifezouane Formation is a formation in the Kem Kem Group, which dates to the Cenomanian and perhaps Albian stages of the Cretaceous period.

In 2024, an international team of paleontologists including British researcher Megan Jacobs, British researcher Roy Smith & Moroccan researcher Samir Zouhri described this fossil as belonging to a new genus and species of pterosaur, which they named Akharhynchus martilli. The generic name, Akharhynchus, combines the Arabic word akhar, meaning "another", with the Greek word rynchus, meaning "snout". The specific name, martilli, references paleontology researcher David Martill.

Akharhynchus is one of at least ten purportedly distinct pterosaur genera recovered from the Kem Kem Group. About half of these are ornithocheirids. Besides Akharhynchus, these include Anhanguera, Coloborhynchus, Ornithocheirus, and Siroccopteryx. Discussions on Kem Kem pterosaurs have noted the problematic practice of naming taxa based on such fragmentary remains, even in the presence of seemingly diagnostic characters. As every pterosaur from these localities is established based on fragmentary rostral and mandibular remains, detailed comparisons are limited. Consequently, the effects of sexual dimorphism and ontogenetic and interspecific variation on perceived diversity are challenging to identify.

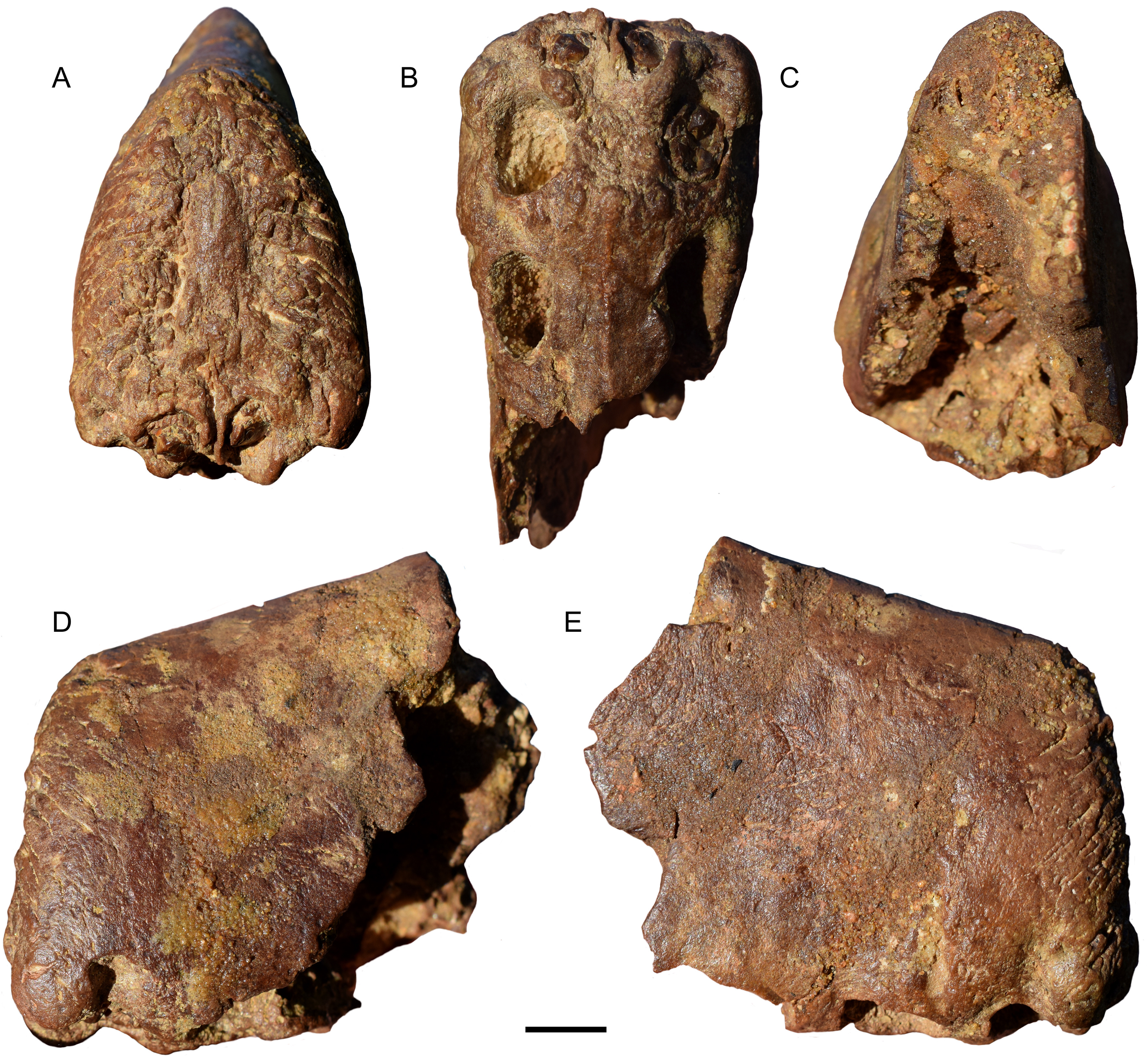

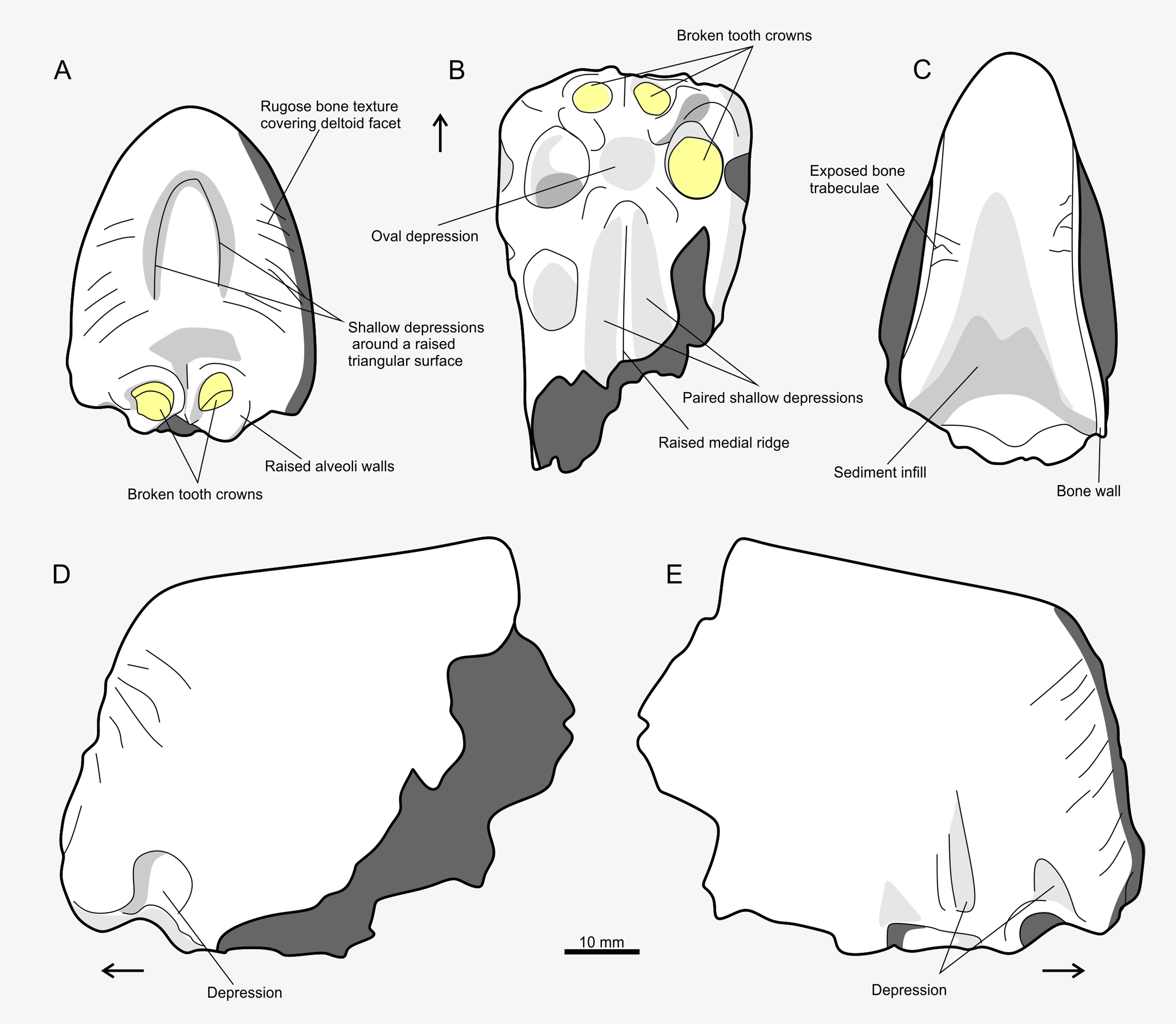
Photograph (left) and line drawing (right) of the holotype

== Description ==
The holotype consists of the anteriormost portion of both premaxillae, preserving three pairs of alveoli (tooth holes) and an incomplete fourth pair. The first pair and the left alveolus of the second pair have broken tooth crowns. As for measurements, the specimen is 53 millimetres (2.1 in) tall at its highest point, 62 millimetres (2.4 in) long, and a maximum width of 37 millimetres (1.5 in).

== Classification ==
In their phylogenetic analyses, Jacobs, Smith & Zouhri (2024) recovered Akharhynchus as a tropeognathine member of the Anhangueria, as the sister taxon to the contemporary Siroccopteryx, which is anatomically alike and similarly fragmentary. These two genera form a clade with the South American Tropeognathus. In turn, the clade formed by these genera is sister to one comprising a polytomy of Australian tropeognathines typically referred to as the Mythungini. The results of their analyses are displayed in the cladogram below:

- Anhangueria
  - Ornithocheirus
  - - Targaryendraconia
    - - Hamipteridae
      - Anhangueridae
        - - Anhanguerinae
          - Coloborhynchinae
        - Tropeognathinae
          - - Thapunngaka
            - Ferrodraco
            - Mythunga
          - - Tropeognathus
            - - Siroccopteryx
              - Akharhynchus

== Paleoecology ==
During the Early to Middle Cretaceous, North Africa bordered the Tethys Sea, which transformed the region into a mangrove-dominated coastal environment filled with tidal flats and waterways. The Kem Kem beds are a sequence of fluvial and lacustrine sediments, though it has some marine sediments. Isotopes from fossils of the dinosaurs Carcharodontosaurus and Spinosaurus suggest that the Kem Kem beds witnessed a temporary monsoon season rather than constant rainfall, similar to modern conditions present in sub-tropical and tropical environments in Southeast Asia and Sub-Saharan Africa. The Izefouane Formation, the unit of the Kem Kem beds from which Akharynchus likely derives, has been interpreted as a braided river system, similar to that found in the Bahariya Formation. This river system was freshwater based on the presence of lungfishes and other typically freshwater vertebrates. This indicates that the Izefouane Formation had a wide variety of features, including river channels, river banks, sandbars, and more. These riverine deposits bore large fishes, including the sawskate Onchopristis, the coelacanth Mawsonia and the bichir Bawitius. The Kem Kem beds also preserve many piscivorous crocodyliformes, such as Elosuchus, Laganosuchus, and Aegisuchus.

Many pterosaurs are known from the Kem Kem beds in addition to Akharhynchus. Fellow ornithocheirids include Anhanguera, Coloborhynchus, Nicorhynchus, Ornithocheirus, and Siroccopteryx. Other taxa include the probable azhdarchoids Alanqa, Leptostomia, and Xericeps, indeterminate azhdarchoids, the tapejarid Afrotapejara, and the possible chaoyangopterid Apatorhamphus. However, all of these pterosaurs are known from fragmentary and/or isolated remains, making their classification difficult to confirm. Many fossils have been found without overlap, such as vertebrae or limb bones, that may belong to these taxa. Dinosaurs are also known from the Kem Kem beds, including the sauropod Rebbachisaurus and the theropods Deltadromeus, Carcharodontosaurus, and Spinosaurus, in addition to unnamed ankylosaurs, titanosaurs, and noasaurid theropods.
