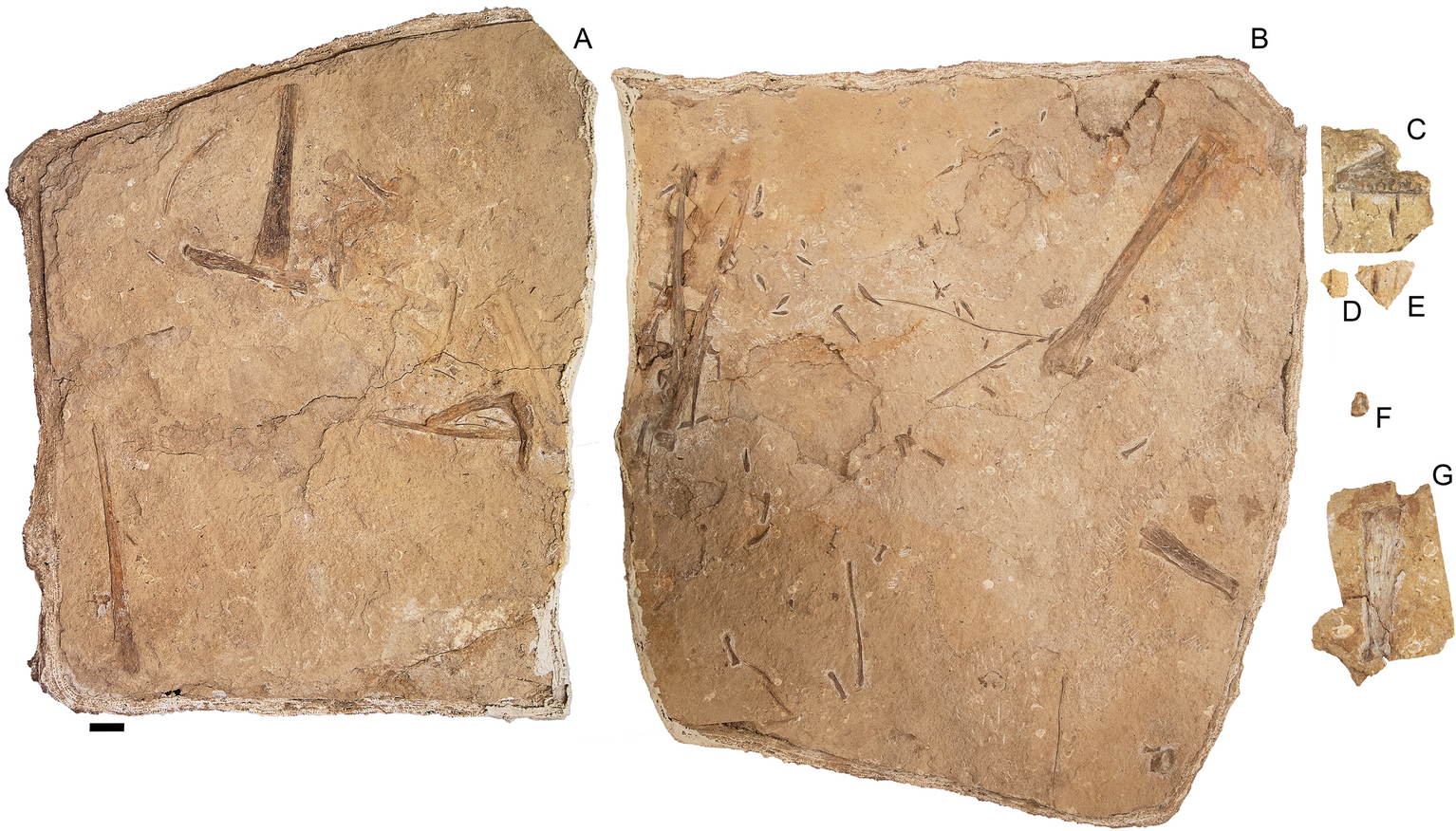
- Haliskia holotype (photograph)
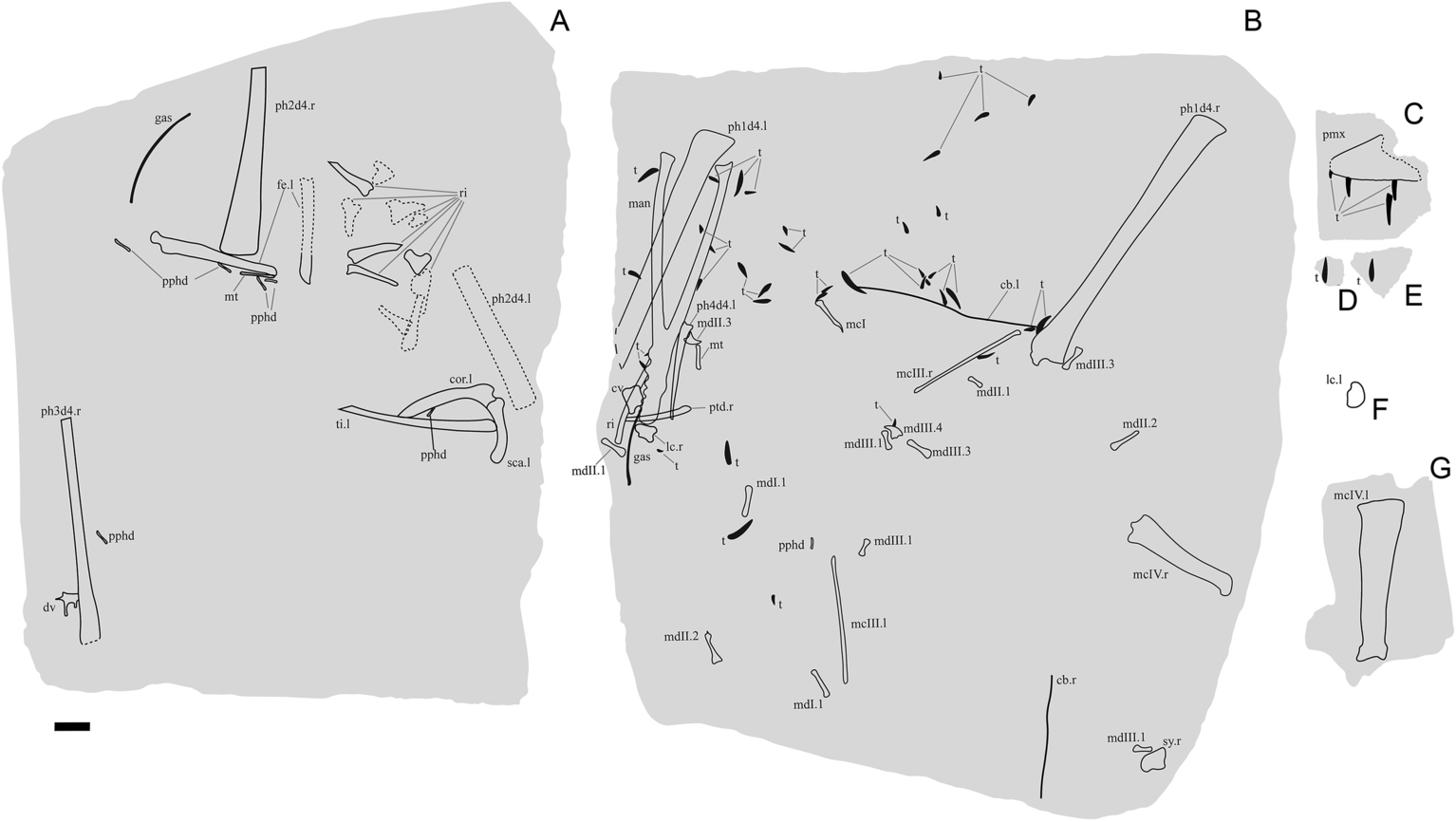
- Haliskia holotype (drawing)

Scientific classification
- Kingdom: Animalia
- Phylum: Chordata
- Order: †Pterosauria
- Suborder: †Pterodactyloidea
- Clade: †Ornithocheirae
- Clade: †Anhangueria (?)
- Family: †Anhangueridae (?)
- Genus: †Haliskia; Pentland et al., 2024
- Species: †H. peterseni

Binomial name
- †Haliskia peterseni Pentland et al., 2024

= Haliskia =

Haliskia Temporal range: Early Cretaceous, middle–upper Albian

Genus of anhanguerian pterosaurs

Haliskia (meaning "sea phantom") is an extinct genus of anhanguerian pteranodontoid pterosaurs from the Early Cretaceous Toolebuc Formation (Eromanga Basin) of Australia. The genus contains a single species, H. peterseni, known from a partial skeleton with skull. Haliskia represents the most complete pterosaur known from Australia.

== Discovery and naming ==
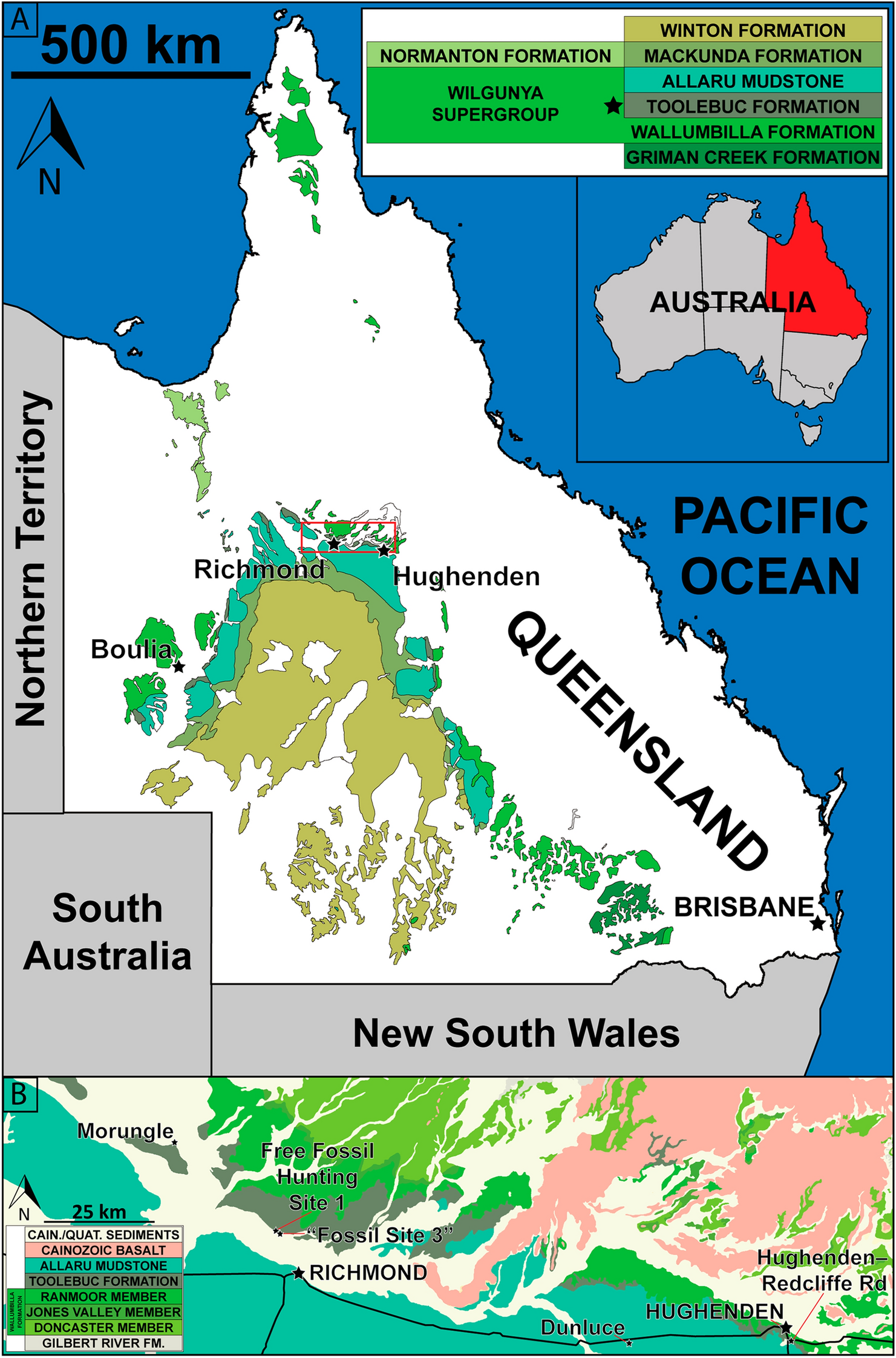
Geologic map of Queensland, Australia indicating Dig Site 3, the type locality of Haliskia

The Haliskia holotype specimen, KK F1426, was discovered by Kevin Petersen in November 2021 within sediments of the Toolebuc Formation (Dig Site 3) near Richmond in Queensland, Australia. The specimen consists of a partial skeleton preserved on multiple slabs. With approximately 22% of the skeleton known, Haliskia represents the most complete pterosaur currently described from the continent. The bones represented include the anterior part of the skull (including a partial premaxilla crest), the mandible, several isolated teeth, a cervical and dorsal vertebra, ribs, the left scapulocoracoid, bones of the fore- and hindlimbs, and other fragments.

In 2024, Pentland et al. described Haliskia peterseni as a new genus and species of anhanguerian pterosaurs based on these fossil remains. The generic name, Haliskia, combines the Greek words ἅλς (háls), meaning "sea", and σκῐᾱ́ (skiā́), referring to a "phantom", "shadow", or "evil spirit". The name invokes a flying phantom-like creature whose shadow haunted the prehistoric Eromanga Sea. The specific name, peterseni, honours Kevin Petersen, the discoverer and preparator of the holotype.

== Description ==
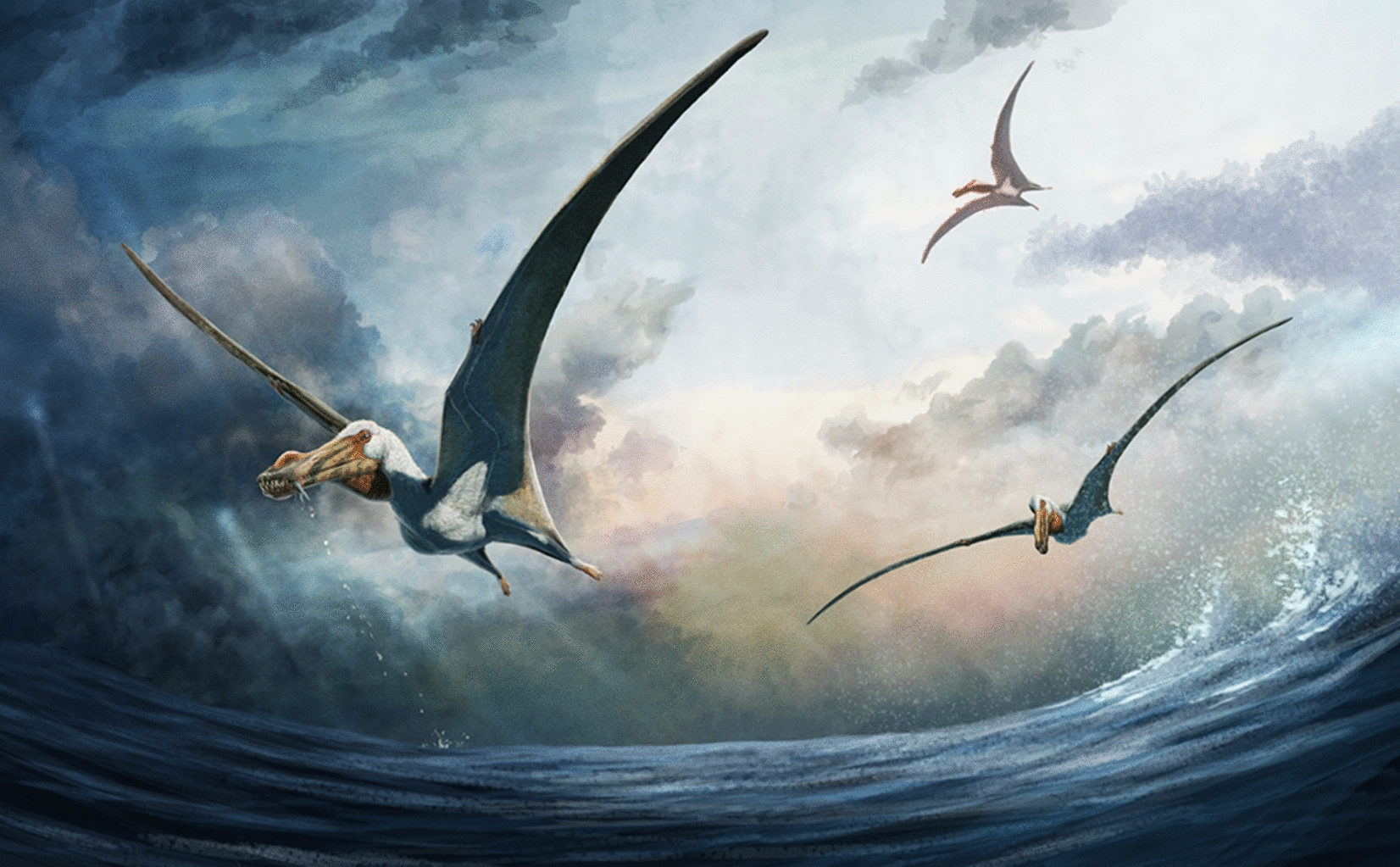
Life restoration by Gabriel N. Ugueto

The holotype specimen of Haliskia represents a skeletally mature individual, as indicated by the fusion of the finger bones and scapulocoracoid. Based on more complete and proportionally similar relatives such as Arthurdactylus, the wingspan of Haliskia can be estimated at 4.6 metres (15 ft). In comparison, the closely related Ferrodraco has a slightly smaller wingspan of around 4 metres (13 ft), and Mythunga likely had a wingspan between 4–6 metres (13–20 ft).

== Classification ==
To test the affinities of Haliskia, Pentland et al. (2024) scored it in two phylogenetic datasets. Both resulting trees differed significantly in topology, relationships, and clade composition. However, in both trees, Haliskia was recovered in a clade with Ferrodraco, which is known from the slightly younger Winton Formation (Cenomanian–early Turonian). Both datasets also agreed that Haliskia can confidently be regarded as a member of the Ornithocheirae.

Using the dataset of Holgado and Pêgas (2020), the two genera were recovered in a polytomy with Mythunga, which is known from the same formation as Haliskia. This clade is the sister taxon to one formed by Siroccopteryx and Tropeognathus within the Tropeognathinae, similar to the results of Richards et al. (2023) who referred to these clades as the Mythungini and Tropeognathini, respectively. The results of this matrix also placed tropeognathines within the Anhangueridae. These results are displayed below in Topology A.

Using the dataset of Andres (2021), Haliskia and Ferrodraco were found in a clade as the sister to the Ornithocheirinae within the Ornithocheiridae. The results of this matrix placed ornithocheirids as the sister taxon to anhangueirds. These results are displayed below in Topology B.

Topology A: Holgado and Pêgas (2020) dataset

- Ornithocheirae
  - basal ornithocheirean(s)
  - Anhangueridae
    - Targaryendraconia
    - - - Hamipterus
        - Iberodactylus
      - - Anhanguerinae
        - Coloborhynchinae
        - Tropeognathinae
          - - Ferrodraco
            - Haliskia
            - Mythunga
          - - Siroccopteryx
            - Tropeognathus

Topology B: Andres (2021) dataset

- Ornithocheirae
  - Anhangueridae
  - Ornithocheiridae
    - Tropeognathus
    - - - Ferrodraco
        - Haliskia
      - Ornithocheirinae
        - Ornithocheirus spp.
        - - Siroccopteryx
          - Coloborhynchus spp.
