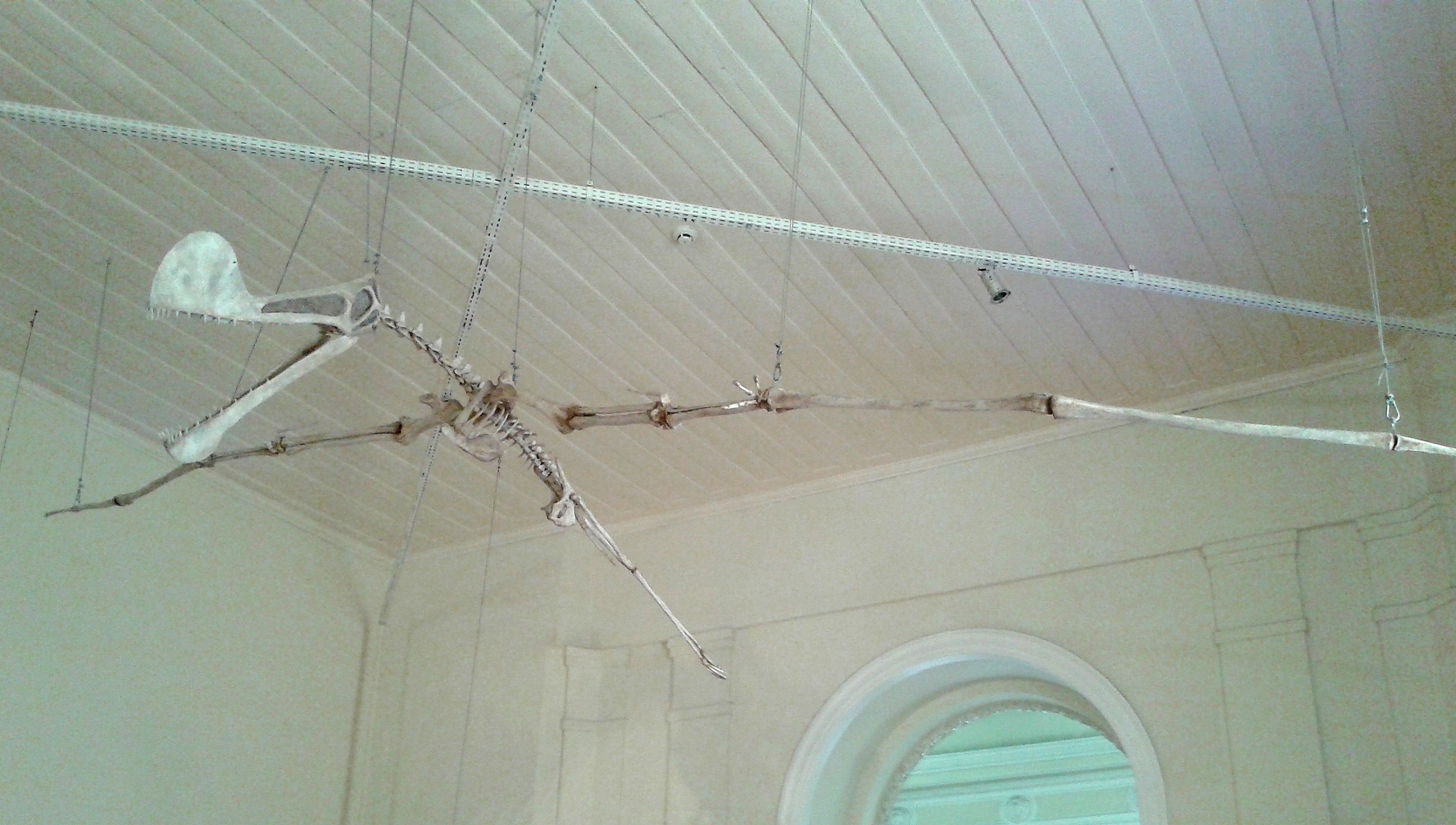
- Restored skeleton of Tropeognathus mesembrinus in the National Museum of Brazil

Scientific classification
- Kingdom: Animalia
- Phylum: Chordata
- Class: Reptilia
- Order: †Pterosauria
- Suborder: †Pterodactyloidea
- Clade: †Ornithocheirae
- Clade: †Anhangueria
- Family: †Anhangueridae; Campos & Kellner, 1985

Type species
- †Anhanguera blittersdorffi Campos & Kellner, 1985

Genera
- †Ornithocheirus?; †Anhanguerinae; †Anhanguera; †Araripesaurus; †Arthurdactylus; †Brasileodactylus; †Caulkicephalus; †Guidraco?; †Liaoningopterus; †Ludodactylus?; †Maaradactylus; †Santanadactylus?; †Coloborhynchinae; †Aerodraco?; †Coloborhynchus; †Nicorhynchus; †Tylodorhynchus; †Uktenadactylus; Tropeognathinae; †Aerodraco?; †Akharhynchus; †Amblydectes; †Siroccopteryx; †Tropeognathus; Mythungini?; †Ferrodraco; †Haliskia; †Mythunga; †Thapunngaka?

Synonyms
- Criorhynchidae? Hooley, 1914; Ornithocheiridae? Seeley, 1870

= Anhangueridae =

Anhangueridae Temporal range: Valanginian-Turonian, ~140–90 Ma

Family of pterodactyloid pterosaurs

Anhangueridae (alternatively called Ornithocheiridae, meaning "bird hands") is a group of pterosaurs within the suborder Pterodactyloidea. These pterosaurs were among the last to possess teeth. Members that belong to this group lived from the Early to Late Cretaceous periods (Valanginian to Turonian stages), around 140 to 90 million years ago.

Anhanguerids are generally infamous for having an enormously controversial and very confusing taxonomy. Despite agreements that these animals were related, and therefore similar to istiodactylids and pteranodontians, there is still no virtual consensus over the exact content and interrelationships of this group. Anhanguerids were the most successful pterosaurs during their reign, and were also the largest pterosaurs before the appearance of the azhdarchids such as Quetzalcoatlus. Anhanguerids were excellent fish hunters, using various flight techniques to catch their prey, and were also capable of flying great distances without flapping constantly.

== History ==
=== Naming ===
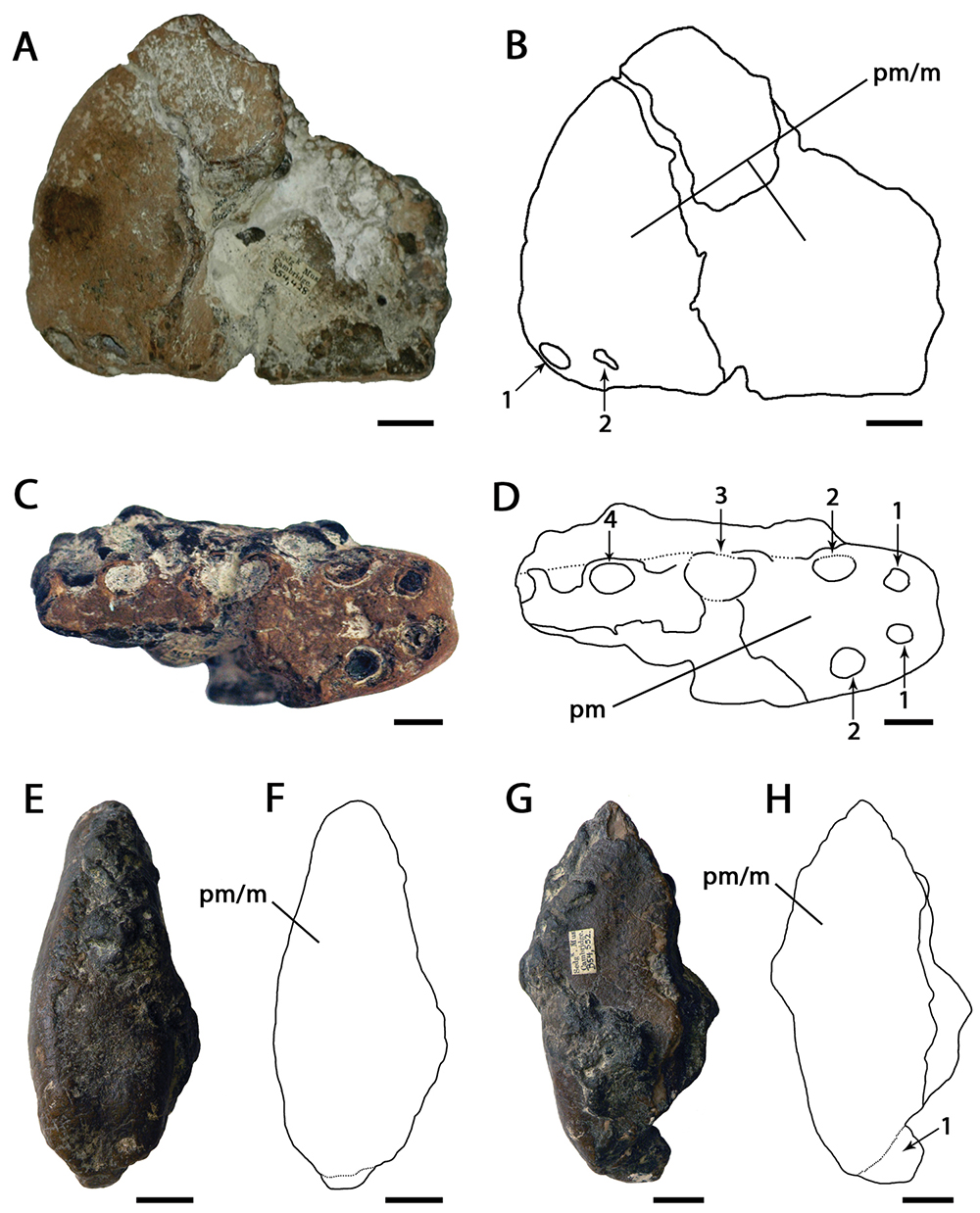
Holotype specimens of Ornithocheirus simus (A to D) and junior synonym O. platyrhinus (E to H)

The family Anhangueridae is without a doubt, one of the most well-known pterosaur groups, mostly due to their very controversial and convoluted taxonomic history. Most of the anhanguerid fossil record consists of isolated teeth, as well as fragmentary bones, reaching hundreds or even thousands of remains in some localities. The first uncovered anhangueridsid remains were described in 1861 by British paleontologist Sir Richard Owen, who assigned the fossil remains to a new species of Pterodactylus: P. simus. In 1869, British paleontologist Harry Govier Seeley erected the new generic name Ornithocheirus (from Ancient Greek meaning "bird hand"), and assigned P. simus as its type species, therefore creating Ornithocheirus simus. Later, in 1870, Seeley created the name Ornithocheirae to only contain Ornithocheirus. Today, this was emended to "Ornithocheiridae Seeley 1870" following the article 11.7.1.3 of the ICZN, retaining the authorship and date of the original "Ornithocheirae Seeley 1870".

In 1874, Owen had proposed two new genera for the Cretaceous British pterosaurs: Coloborhynchus (meaning "maimed beak") and Criorhynchus (meaning "ram beak") based on highly distinctive jaw fragments. Owen reassigned P. simus as the type species of Criorhynchus, creating Criorhynchus simus. He referred three species to Coloborhynchus, including the addition of a new species called C. clavirostris; no type species was designated, however. In 1876, however, Seeley pointed out that Criorhynchus was a junior synonym of Ornithocheirus, a concept that was followed by paleontologist Richard Lydekker in 1888. In the latter year, Lydekker acknowledged that Ornithocheirus simus was the type species of Ornithocheirus, and also distinguished O. simus by its tall rostrum, while other species referred to Ornithocheirus had lanceolate jaw tips. Therefore, to avoid confusion, Lydekker preferred to use the name Criorhynchus for O. simus, and Ornithocheirus for the species with lanceolate jaw tips, a concept later favored by paleontologist Reginald Walter Hooley in 1914. In his review of Ornithocheirus, he divided the family Ornithocheiridae into two subfamilies: Ornithocheirinae and Criorhynchinae; the former consisted of Ornithocheirus and Lonchodectes, while the latter consisted of Amblydectes and Criorhynchus. In his review, Hooley also considered the species Coloborhynchus clavirostris as a synonym of Criorhynchus simus. In 1967, paleontologist Oskar Kuhn placed Criorhynchus within the family Criorhynchidae (which is now considered synonymous to Anhangueridae), and recognized Ornithocheirus within the family Ornithocheiridae and subfamily Ornithocheirinae. He also designated the species Coloborhynchus clavirostris as the type species of Coloborhynchus, but agreed with Hooley that it was synonymous with Criorhynchus simus. In 1994, however, Yuong-Nam Lee revalidated the genus Coloborhynchus (with C. clavirostris as its type species), and regarded it as distinct from Criorhynchus simus. Later, in 2001, paleontologist David Unwin revised the taxonomic history of the Cambridge Greensand pterosaurs, and divided Ornithocheiridae into three genera: Ornithocheirus, Coloborhynchus and Anhanguera. Unwin also designated Ornithocheirus simus as the type and only species of Ornithocheirus.

In 2003, Unwin defined the family Ornithocheiridae as Haopterus gracilis, Ornithocheirus simus, their most recent common ancestor, and all its descendants. He included the genera Anhanguera, Brasileodactylus, Coloborhynchus, Haopterus, Ludodactylus and Ornithocheirus within the family, and also concluded that Araripesaurus, Arthurdactylus and Santanadactylus may belong to this family as well. However, their taxonomic status and precise relationships with other ornithocheirids are uncertain. In 2019, upon the description of the pterosaur Mimodactylus, Haopterus, which was assigned to this family by Unwin, and recovered as a basal eupterodactyloid by Brian Andres and colleagues, was reassigned by Alexander Kellner and colleagues as the sister taxon of the former.

In 2014, Andres and colleagues defined the Ornithocheiridae with a different definition: the most inclusive clade containing Ornithocheirus simus but not Anhanguera blittersdorffi. They placed the genera Coloborhynchus, Ornithocheirus and Tropeognathus within the Ornithocheiridae, while placing Anhanguera within the separate family Anhangueridae. However, back in 2001, Unwin considered the name Anhangueridae a junior synonym of Ornithocheiridae, a concept that was later followed by several paleontologists such as Mark Witton in 2013. Some phylogenetic analyses, however, contradict this name synonymy, with Ornithocheiridae and Anhangueridae classified as different families, therefore following the 2014 analysis by Andres and colleagues instead. Many modern studies such as the ones by Kellner and colleagues in 2019 have used a different concept, classifying Coloborhynchus, Tropeognathus, as well as several other close relatives such as Ludodactylus and Caulkicephalus within the Anhangueridae, which, along with the family Hamipteridae, forms the larger group Anhangueria. They assigned Ornithocheirus outside the Anhangueria due to being undiagnosable. Most recent studies have since followed this concept.

== Description ==
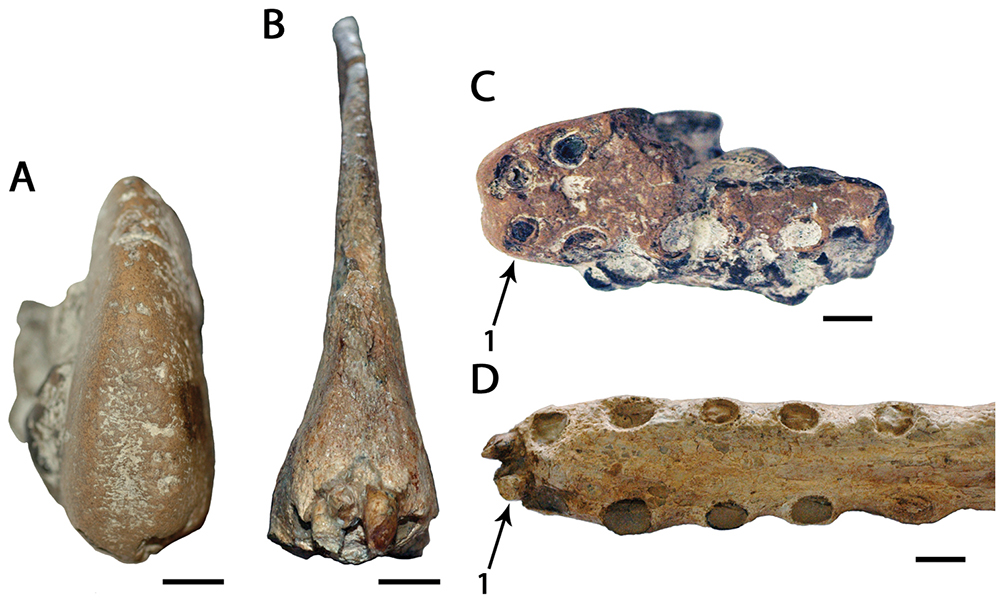
Comparison between the holotypes of Ornithocheirus (A and C) and Tropeognathus (B and D)

Among toothed pterodactyloids, anhanguerids were the largest; they were also among the most successful and widely distributed pterosaurs. Anhanguerids were characterized by long jaws with spike-like teeth. Anhanguerid wingspans varied in size, with smaller species having wingspans of approximately 4 meters (13 ft), while giant morphs reached wingspans of up to 8 meters (26 ft) or more. Specimen NHMUK R481, a specimen that belongs to the species Coloborhynchus capito, the largest toothed pterosaur, had a wingspan that may have reached 7 meters (23 ft). However, in 2013, a specimen referred to the genus Tropeognathus (MN 6594-V), a possible anhanguerid), was calculated to have had a normal wingspan of 8.26 meters (27.1 ft), with another calculated maximum wingspan reached 8.70 meters (28.5 ft), indicating that the wingspans of toothed pterosaurs could exceed 7 meters (23 ft).

=== Skull ===
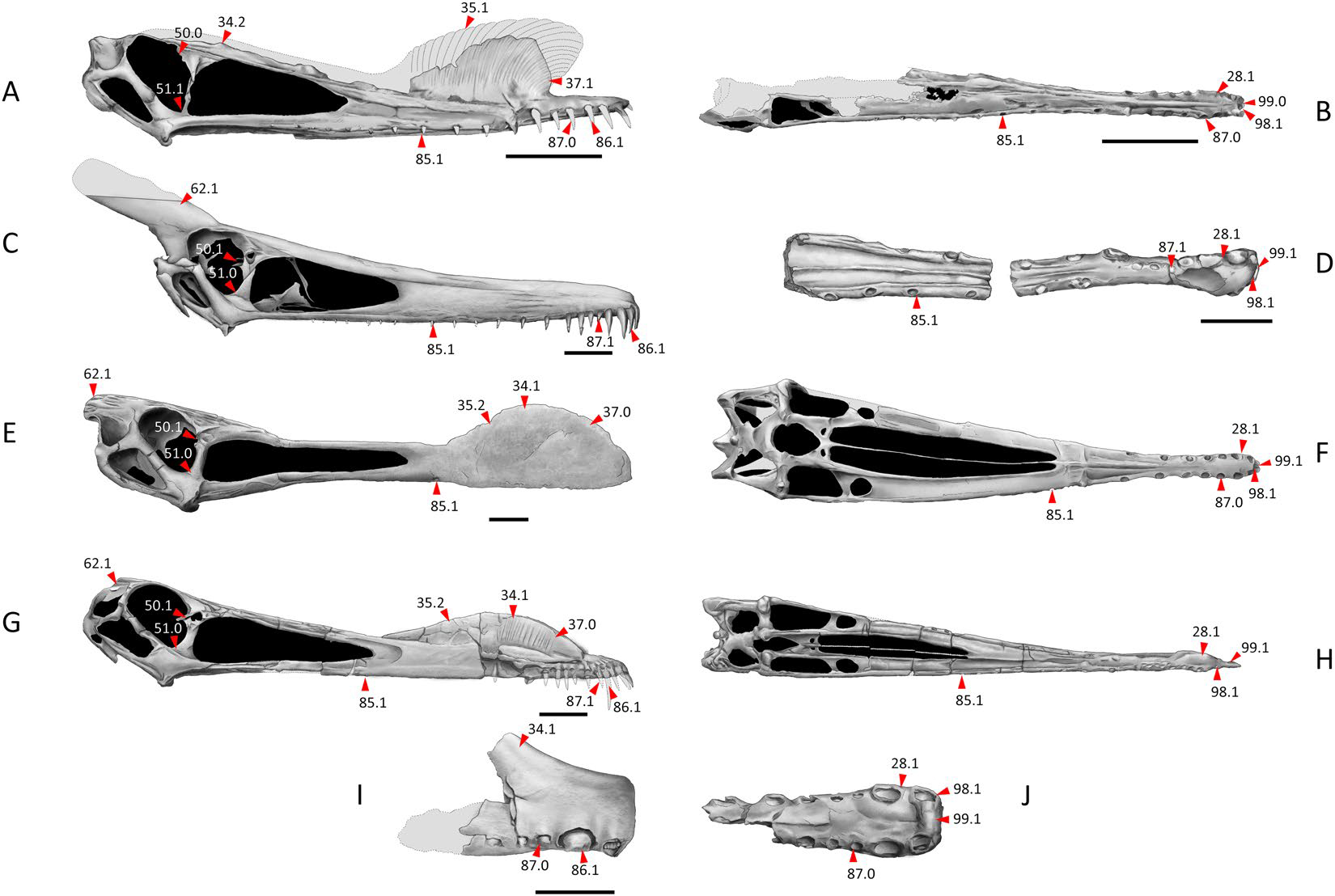
Skull comparisons between different anhanguerians, notice the ornithocheirids Caulkicephalus (D), Tropeognathus (E and F) and Uktenadactylus (I and J)

Anhanguerids had elongated jaws with rounded sagittal crests on both tips, as well as robust fang-like teeth. The sagittal crest of the species Ornithocheirus simus and Tropeognathus mesembrinus extended to the anterior end of the rostrum, a feature that is also seen in the anhanguerid species Siroccopteryx moroccensis; further synapomorphies between these three species were also found, including the premaxilla having a tall and narrow shape in anterior aspect, the anterolateral margins of the premaxilla being convex in both anterior and lateral view, a feature that resulted in a bluntly rounded outline of the tip of the rostrum. The rostrum in S. moroccensis lacks a constriction that is posterior to the anterior rosette, a feature also shared by O. simus and T. mesembrinus, therefore another synapomorphy supported by these three species. Yet another feature shared by these three species is that the teeth are short, straight, and relatively uniform in size, something that is not present in other ornithocheirans such as Coloborhynchus and Anhanguera. In Coloborhynchus, the teeth were found to have been heterodont, elongated, recurved and caniniform, which is similar to those seen in another anhanguerid called Caulkicephalus. The genus Caulkicephalus, though having similarities with other anhanguerids, including the anterior end of the rostrum being transversely expanded, or having a low, bony sagittal crest that includes a smooth dorsal margin on the rostrum, still possesses some unique features. The most distinct characteristic of Caulkicephalus is that it bores a frontoparietal crest, a feature that is only seen in pteranodontians such as Pteranodon, and in Ludodactylus, a pterosaur once assigned to the Ornithocheiridae, but some recent analysis have placed it within the more inclusive group Anhangueria. Other studies, however, have recovered it within the Anhangueridae instead.

=== Postcranial skeleton ===
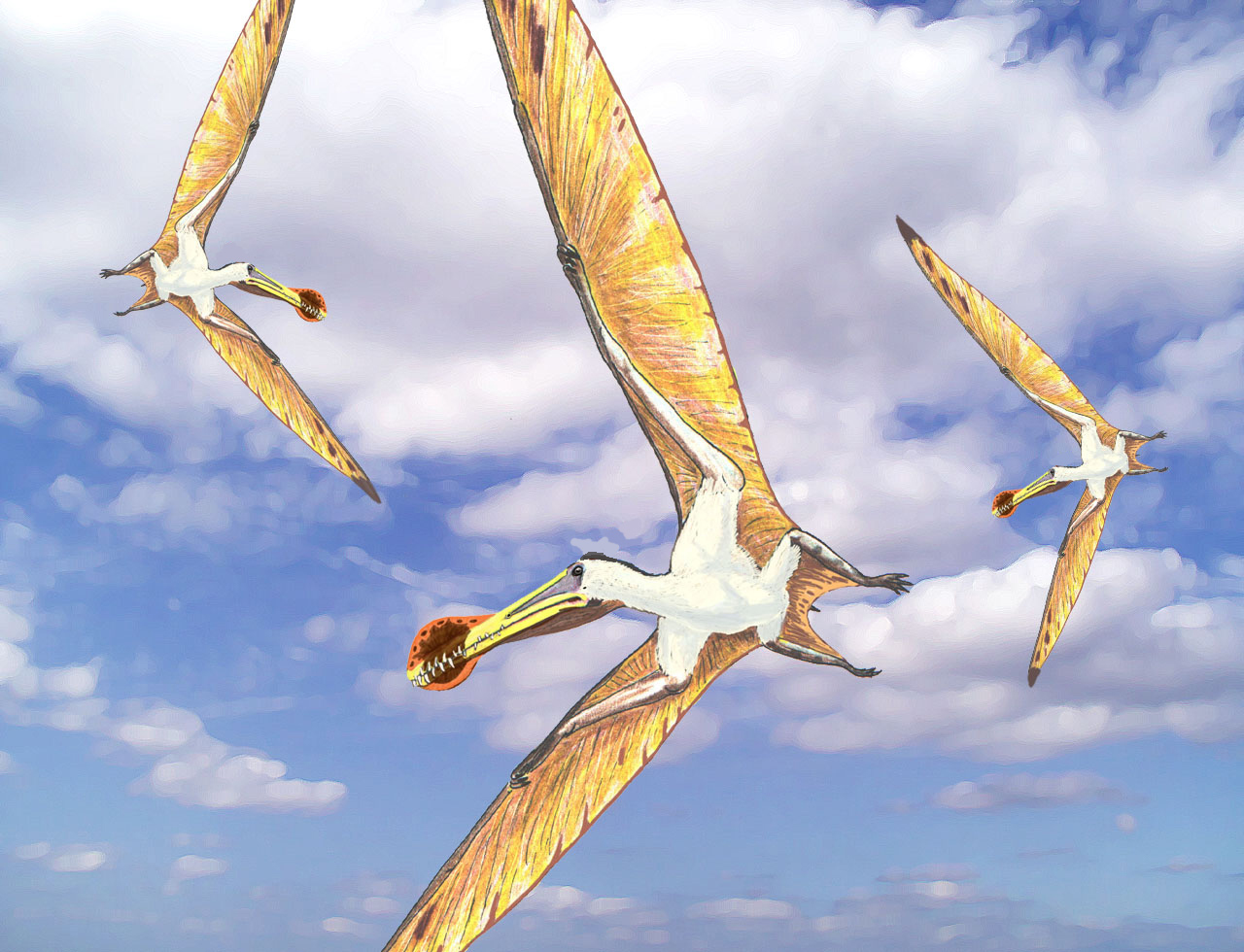
Restoration of three Tropeognathus in flight, notice their high aspect ratio

The forelimbs of anhanguerids were proportionally enormous, around five times longer than their legs. Substantial anchorage on the body is required given the mighty arms, and accordingly, anhanguerids have robust scapulocoracoids, and stout, deeply keeled sterna, which served the purpose of housing their substantial forelimb muscles. The shoulder or pectoral girdle in anhanguerids is set at a perpendicular angle to the spine, with the coracoids being much longer than the scapulae. The shoulder girdle is also of typical construction for ornithocheiroids. Over 60 percent of the wing length is occupied by the wing fingers, making them among the longest possessed by any pterodactyloids.

In adult anhanguerids, the sacrum develops a supraneural plate above its neural spines. The tails of anhanguerids are poorly known, though they appear to be composed of at least eleven short vertebrae, and become relatively circular in cross section toward the end of the series. Like the related istiodactylids, the slender femora of anhanguerids have femoral heads that project almost in line with the femoral shaft, but seem to lack prominent processes that anchor their hindlimb muscles. Anhanguerids shinbones (or tibiae) are similarly developed and of equal length to the femora. Although the feet in anhanguerids are poorly known, they seem to be relatively small and gracile, with undeveloped claws and a hook-like fifth metatarsal.

== Classification ==
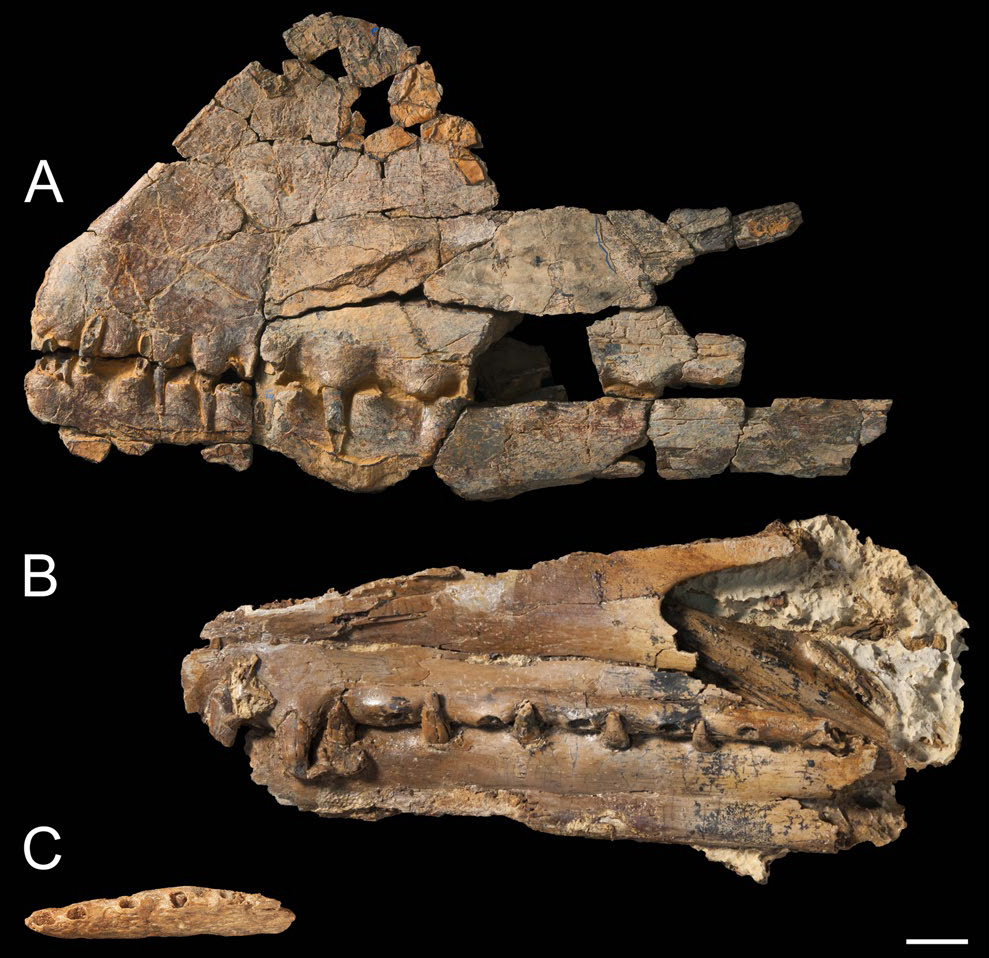
Holotype skull and mandible of the anhanguerids Ferrodraco (A) and Mythunga (B), and holotype mandible of Aussiedraco (C)

The family Anhanguerids has had a controversial and very confusing taxonomic history; paleontologists who have studied this group seem to have had a different opinion on the composition of anhanguerid taxonomy. The term Anhangueridae was coined by Diogenes de Almeida Campos and Kellner in 1985 to refer to pterosaurs that belong in this family. In 2001, however, Unwin argued that the name Ornithocheiridae refers to an identical group, and should have nomenclatural priority. He therefore considered Anhangueridae a junior synonym of Ornithocheiridae in his study of pterosaur phylogeny in 2003. However, in many recent studies, Anhangueridae is recovered as a separate and distinct family from Ornithocheiridae, each containing different genera. The original term Ornithocheirae by Seeley had been redefined as the least inclusive clade containing Anhanguera blittersdorffi and Ornithocheirus simus, therefore it is recovered as a larger group comprising the families Anhangueridae and Ornithocheiridae in recent analysis.

=== Formerly assigned genera ===
In the past, many pterosaur genera were assigned to the Ornithocheiridae; however, following recent studies, these supposed ornithocheirids had been reclassified to other groups or families. The pterosaur Boreopterus for example, was initially classified within the Ornithocheiridae; however, later analysis had found it in a different family called Boreopteridae, with Boreopterus being the sister taxon of Zhenyuanopterus; both pterosaurs were recovered as basal members of the Lanceodontia in several recent studies such as the ones by Pêgas and colleagues, and Adele Pentland and colleagues, both studies of which are from 2019.

Aetodactylus is another pterosaur that was initially classified within the Ornithocheiridae; later analysis have found it outside the Ornithocheiridae: Timothy Myers in 2015 and Nicholas Longrich and colleagues in 2018 for example, are two studies that found Aetodactylus as sister taxon to the two species of Cimoliopterus (C. cuvieri and C. dunni). In 2019, Pêgas and colleagues have found Aetodactylus, along with two other pterosaurs (Camposipterus and Cimoliopterus), within the clade Targaryendraconia, more specifically placed within the family Cimoliopteridae in a polytomy.

The genus Haopterus was used to define the Ornithocheiridae in Unwin's 2003 study; however, Andres and Myers in 2013 argued that Haopterus had not been previously referred to the Ornithocheiridae besides a note added in proof to Unwin in 2001 that stated that Haopterus appeared to be a small ornithocheirid. Phylogenetic analyses since then have found Haopterus as a rogue taxon either within the Pterodactyloidea, the Ornithocheiroidea, the Pteranodontoidea, or the Istiodactylidae. In the phylogenetic analysis by Andres and Myers, Haopterus was recovered as a stable sister taxon to the group Ornithocheiroidea. Some later analyses have also recovered this concept, with both Haopterus and the Ornithocheiroidea placed within the larger group Eupterodactyloidea. Another study in 2019 recovered Haopterus within a different group called Mimodactylidae.

=== Phylogeny ===
Different phylogenetic analysis have found Ornithocheiridae or Anhangueridae to comprise different genera, the most typical ones being Tropeognathus, Coloborhynchus and Ornithocheirus. In 2014, Andres and colleagues created the subfamily Ornithocheirinae to contain Coloborhynchus and Ornithocheirus, as a sister taxon to Tropeognathus, and altogether formed the family Ornithocheiridae. In 2018, Longrich and colleagues had included the genus Siroccopteryx in their phylogenetic analysis, specifically as a member of the ornithocheirine subfamily, sister taxon to Coloborhynchus. In 2019, a study performed by Adele Pentland and colleagues had found the Ornithocheiridae to comprise more genera; while the typical Tropeognathus, Coloborhynchus and Ornithocheirus clade was included in their analysis, Pentland and colleagues found the genera Ferrodraco and Mythunga to belong the Ornithocheiridae as well, specifically sister taxa within the Ornithocheirinae, closely related to Ornithocheirus. In the same year, Megan Jacobs and colleagues have recovered a different set of relationships for ornithocheirids in their analysis. Within the family, three clades emerge: the first one consists of Ornithocheirus, Tropeognathus and Siroccopteryx, the second one comprises Uktenadactylus with several Coloborhynchus species, and the third one comprises Cimoliopterus and Camposipterus. The close relationship between Siroccopteryx, Ornithocheirus and Tropeognathus is supported by several synapomorphies, such the teeth being short, straight, and relatively uniform in size.

Several other recent studies such as the ones by Alexander Kellner and colleagues, or the one by Pêgas and colleagues, both in 2019, have recovered Coloborhynchus, Siroccopteryx, Tropeognathus and Uktenadactylus within the family Anhangueridae instead of the Ornithocheiridae. In 2020, a study by Borja Holgado and Pêgas had also recovered both Ferrodraco and Mythunga within the Anhangueridae instead of this family.

Cimoliopterus has generally been recovered outside of Anhangueridae; subsequent analyses have found it as sister taxon to Aetodactylus, as mentioned earlier. Another possible position for Cimoliopterus is within the clade Targaryendraconia, again, closely related to Aetodactylus, and together with Camposipterus, the three formed the family Cimoliopteridae. In the analysis by Jacobs and colleagues, the two Cimoliopterus species had been found as sister taxa to the three Camposipterus species (C. nasutus, C. colorhinus and C. segwickii), altogether formed an unnamed clade within the Ornithocheiridae. However, as noted by Jacobs and colleagues, support for some of these arrangements is relatively weak due to the limited number of characters that can be scored, and the levels of homoplasy are very high.

The relationships between Anhangueridae and other clades is shown below in a cladogram reproduced from a 2020 study by Borja Holgado and Rubi Pêgas:

- Lanceodontia
  - Istiodactyliformes
  - Ornithocheiriformes
    - Boreopteridae
    - - Ornithocheirus
      - - Targaryendraconia
          - Targaryendraconidae
          - Cimoliopteridae
        - Anhangueria
          - Hamipteridae
          - Anhangueridae

The cladogram below showing internal relationships of Anhangueridae is reproduced from Richards et al. (2023), who based their data matrix on that of Holgado and Pêgas. In the paper they erect the clade Mythungini which comprises all Australian tropeognathines.

- Anhangueridae
  - - Coloborhynchinae
      - Aerodraco
      - - Coloborhynchus
        - - Nicorhynchus
          - Uktenadactylus
    - Anhanguerinae
      - - Ludodactylus
        - - Caulkicephalus
          - Guidraco
      - - Liaoningopterus
        - Cearadactylus
        - Maaradactylus
        - - AMNH 22555
          - Anhanguera
  - - Tropeognathinae
      - Tropeognathini
        - Siroccopteryx
        - Tropeognathus
        - Amblydectes
      - Mythungini
        - Ferrodraco
        - Thapunngaka
        - Mythunga

The cladogram below showing internal relationships of Ornithocheiriformes including Anhangueridae is reproduced from Pêgas (2025), who also suggested that Mythunga should be classified as a nomen dubium, as the author found none of the proposed diagnostic characters to be unique to this genus, and disagreed with using the tribe Mythungini.

- Ornithocheiriformes
  - - Ornithocheiridae
      - Thapunngaka
      - - Ornithocheirus
        - FSAC-KK 5025
          (Kem Kem beds, O. cf. simus)
  - - Anhangueroidea
      - Targaryendraconia
        - Targaryendraconidae
        - Cimoliopteridae
      - Anhangueria
        - Hamipteridae
          - Iberodactylus
          - Hamipterus
        - Anhangueridae
          - Tropeognathinae
            - Tropeognathus
            - - - Haliskia
                - Ferrodraco
              - - Aerodraco
                - - Akharhynchus
                  - Siroccopteryx
          - - Coloborhynchinae
              - Coloborhynchus
              - - Uktenadactylus spp.
                - Nicorhynchus spp.
            - Anhanguerinae
              - - Caulkicephalus
                - - Guidraco
                  - Ludodactylus
              - - Liaoningopterus
                - - - Brasileodactylus
                    - Maaradactylus
                  - Anhanguera spp.

== Paleobiology ==
=== Diet and feeding ===
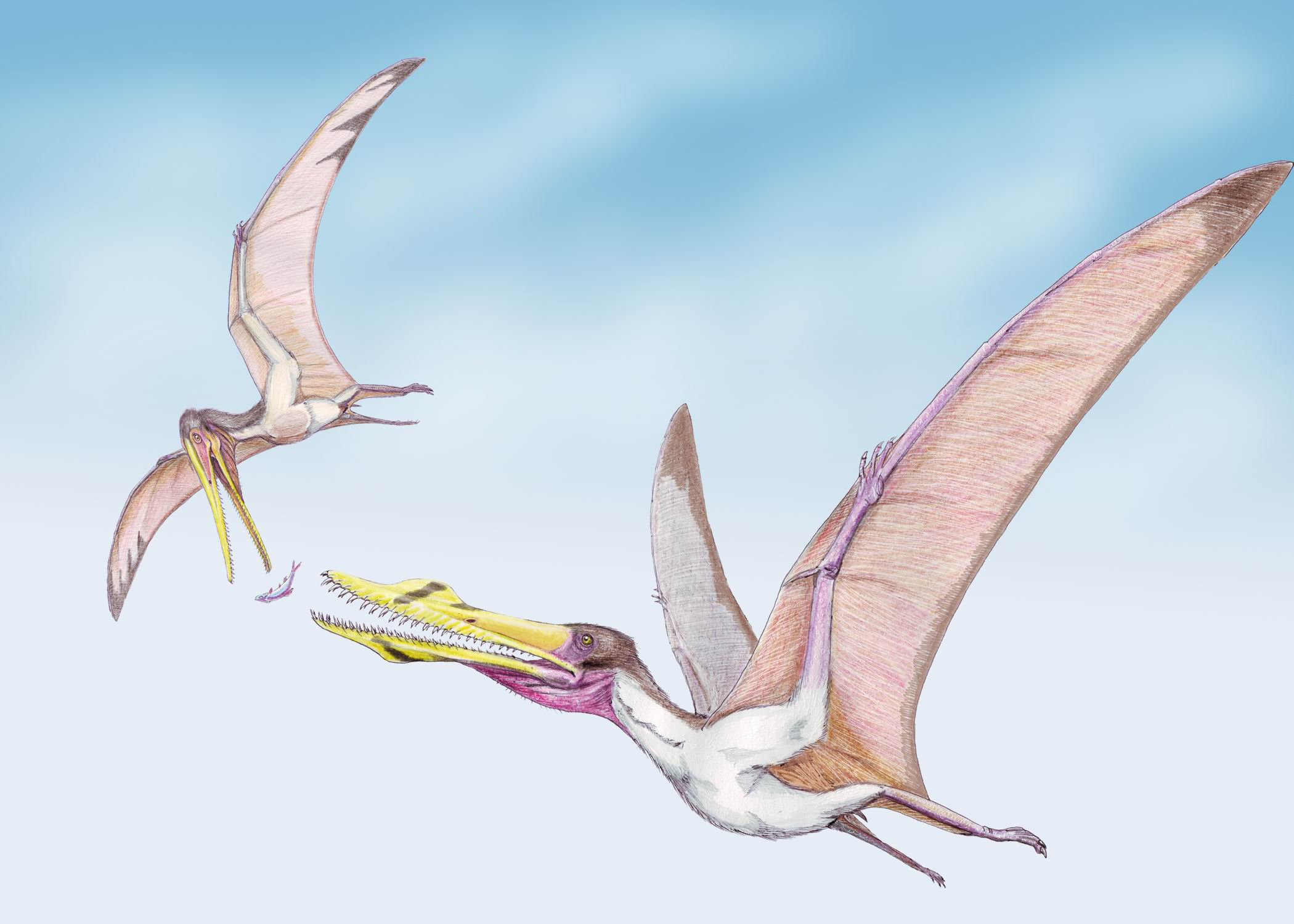
Restoration of Cimoliopterus stealing prey from a Lonchodectes

Anhanguerids are generally considered piscivorous animals, mainly because they seem to have been suited for flight over marine settings; in fact, most anhanguerids are known from lagoonal, coastal and marine deposits. Although the manner in which anhanguerids gathered their food has not been researched in detail, it is generally thought that members of this family either fed like modern-day skimmers, pushing their lower jaw through the water to snap up food upon impact, or fed by gleaning food from the water surface like some modern-day terns and frigatebirds. The skim-feeding hypothesis on anhanguerids has been discounted in recent assessments of pterosaur skim-feeding, while dip-feeding is supported by a number of anatomical features. The elongated rostra of anhanguerids are considered ideal for reaching into the water to grab swimming creatures; the rostral crests of anhanguerids would have worked well as stabilizers for the jaws tips while being plunged into the water. Large, forward-facing eyes and well-developed flocculi are ideal for dip-feeding as well, which permits effective spotting of prey as well as judgement of distances when striking at them; as such, it seems likely that at least several anhanguerids were efficient dip feeders. Sedate foraging methods might have also been used when hunting—examples of these methods are: reaching food while being alighted on the water surface, and shallow surface dives.

=== Locomotion and flight ===
Similar to modern-day albatrosses, most anhanguerids used a flight technique called "dynamic soaring", which consists of travelling long distances without flapping using the vertical gradient of wind speed near the ocean surface as an advantage, at moderate flight speed. Several studies showed that most anhanguerids sprawled their limbs to a large degree, similar to crocodiles, while other studies conclude that anhanguerids were generally quadrupedal. Yet other studies concluded that anhanguerids held their limbs more or less vertically extended, similar to an avian or mammalian configuration. Some studies in later genera show that anhanguerids spend much of their time at sea, and as a result, they perhaps influenced the later pteranodontids with the same piscivorous diet, as well as their well-developed flight techniques. Analyses of limb proportions in the genus Anhanguera, however, show that some anhanguerids were consistent with hopping, but the later genera were suggested that they most likely walked on four limbs, which consists on their wing-fingers as the front limbs, and using their hind limbs to balance.

== Paleoecology ==
Anhanguerids were a widespread type of pterosaur, with many fossil remains found across the world. The first true anhanguerid specimens were uncovered in the Cambridge Greensand of England, belonging to the infamous genus Ornithocheirus, and dated back to the Albian stage of the Early Cretaceous. Within the fossil site, several other pterosaurs were also found, including the pterosaurs Amblydectes and Coloborhynchus, the targaryendraconian Camposipterus, the lonchodraconid Lonchodraco, and the azhdarchoid Ornithostoma. The ornithischians Anoplosaurus, Acanthopholis, and the dubious Eucercosaurus and Trachodon were also found within the formation. Fossil remains of the sauropod Macrurosaurus were also present. The bird Enaliornis, as well as the ichthyosaurs Cetarthrosaurus, Platypterygius and Sisteronia were also found alongside the remains of anhanguerids.

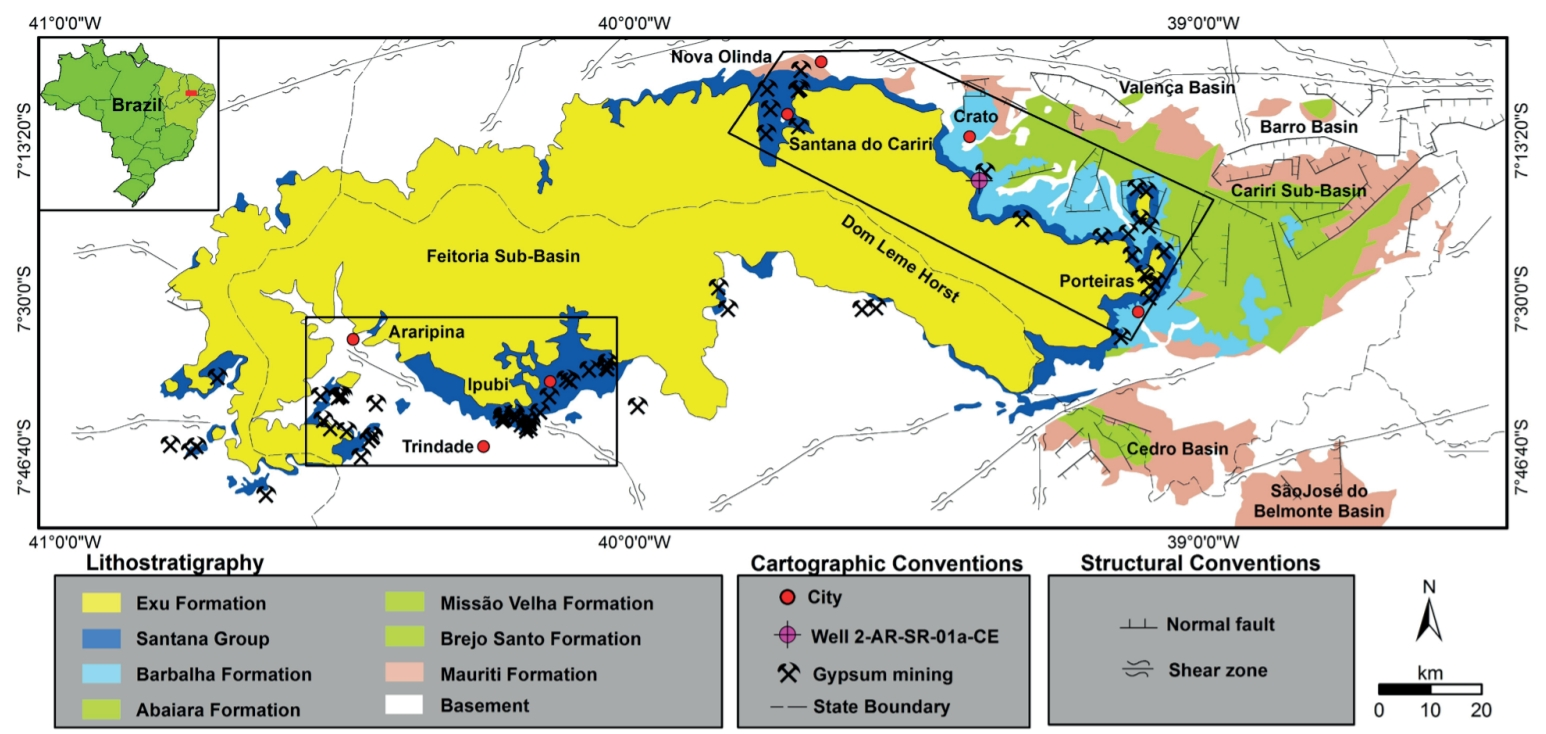
Geological map of the Araripe Basin of Brazil, with the extent of the Santana Group shown in dark blue

A Lagerstätte called the Santana Group (sometimes known as the Santana Formation) in northeastern Brazil was found to contain a large number of pterosaur genera. The most diverse formation of the group is the Romualdo Formation, known for its wide variety of pterosaur remains. The formation dates back around 111 to 108 million years ago, also during the Albian stage of the Early Cretaceous. The Romualdo Formation is found to contain a variety of anhanguerids, including Tropeognathus, Coloborhynchus and Araripesaurus, the targaryendraconian Barbosania as well as close relatives such as Anhanguera and Maaradactylus. The related Araripedactylus, Brasileodactylus, Cearadactylus, Santanadactylus and Unwindia were also present within the fossil site. Many other pterosaur were found within, including the tapejarid Tapejara, as well as the thalassodromids (or thalassodromines, depending on the author) Thalassodromeus and Tupuxuara. Other animals such the theropods Irritator, Mirischia and Santanaraptor, as well as the crocodylomorph Araripesuchus were also found. Several turtle remains were found within the formation, with some specimens referred to the genera Santanachelys, Cearachelys and Araripemys. Many fish remains were also found, assigned to the genera Brannerion, Rhinobatos, Rhacolepis, Tharrhias and Tribodus.

Anhanguerids were also partially distributed in North America, and several specimens are thought to belong to the genus Uktenadactylus (originally Coloborhychus wadleighi). This pterosaur was uncovered in the Paw Paw Formation of Texas, United States, which dated back to the Albian and Cenomanian stages. The formation includes several ankylosaurian dinosaurs such as Pawpawsaurus, Texasetes and an indetermine nodosaurid. Within the fossil site, several specimens of ammonoids were thought to belong to the genera Turrilites and Scaphites, and along with these, remains of the shark Leptostyrax were also found.

== See also ==
- Pterosaur size
