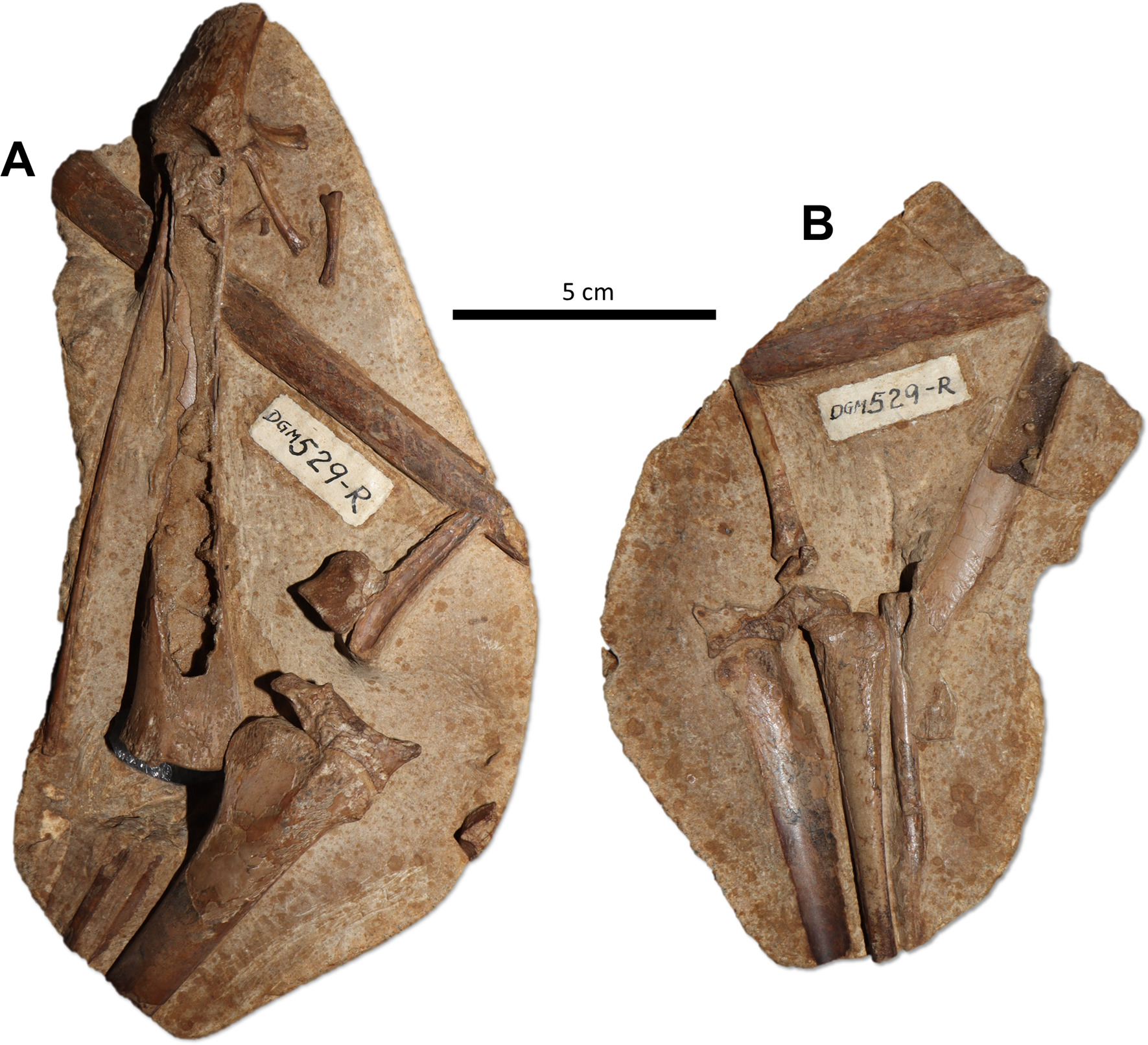
- Holotype specimen

Scientific classification
- Kingdom: Animalia
- Phylum: Chordata
- Class: Reptilia
- Order: †Pterosauria
- Suborder: †Pterodactyloidea
- Family: †Ornithocheiridae
- Genus: †Araripesaurus
- Species: †A. castilhoi

Binomial name
- †Araripesaurus castilhoi Price, 1971

= Araripesaurus =

Araripesaurus Temporal range: Aptian-Albian ~112 Ma

Genus of pterosaur (fossil)

Araripesaurus is a potentially dubious genus a pterosaur belonging to the suborder Pterodactyloidea, it was discovered in the Romualdo Formation of the Santana Group in northeastern Brazil, which dates back to the Aptian and Albian of the Early Cretaceous. The type species is A. castilhoi.

== Discovery and naming ==
The genus was named in 1971 by Brazilian paleontologist Llewellyn Ivor Price. The type species is Araripesaurus castilhoi. The genus name refers to the Araripe Plateau. The specific name honors the collector Moacir Marques de Castilho, who in 1966 donated the chalk nodule containing the fossil. The holotype, DNPM (DGM 529-R), consists of a partial wing, including distal fragments of the radius and ulna, carpals, all metacarpals and several digits. The specimen was a subadult. Its wingspan was estimated at 2.2 meters (7 ft 3 in). Two other possible specimens are known; both consist of wing fragments and are roughly a third larger than the holotype, and were referred to the genus by Price.

In 1985 Peter Wellnhofer has named a second species, Araripesaurus santanae; this and two unnamed Araripesaurus sp. indicated by Wellnhofer, were in 1990 by Kellner moved to Anhanguera as A. santanae.

== Classification ==
Price placed Araripesaurus in the Ornithocheiridae. Araripesaurus was the first pterosaur known from the Santana Formation. Later, other species were named from more complete remains and this raised the question whether they could be identical to Araripesaurus. In 1991 researcher Alexander Kellner concluded that Araripesaurus was identical to Santanadactylus and that due to a lack of distinguishing features it could only be more generally classified as a pterodactyloid. In 2000 Kellner reassessed the genus and concluded that precisely because of such a lack of autapomorphies (unique characters), it could not be synonymized with Santanadactylus and gave its position after a cladistic analysis as close to Anhangueridae, more derived than Istiodactylus. Kellner also indicated that Araripesaurus resembled Anhanguera piscator in morphology, albeit considerably smaller. In a comprehensive review of the taxonomy and paleobiology of Cretaceous pterosaurs from the Araripe Basin by Pinheiro et al. (2025), Araripesaurus was suggested to be a nomen dubium due to the specimens being insufficient for a valid diagnosis and the proposed diagnostic features being too general for all pteranodontoids.

== See also ==
- Timeline of pterosaur research
- List of pterosaurs
