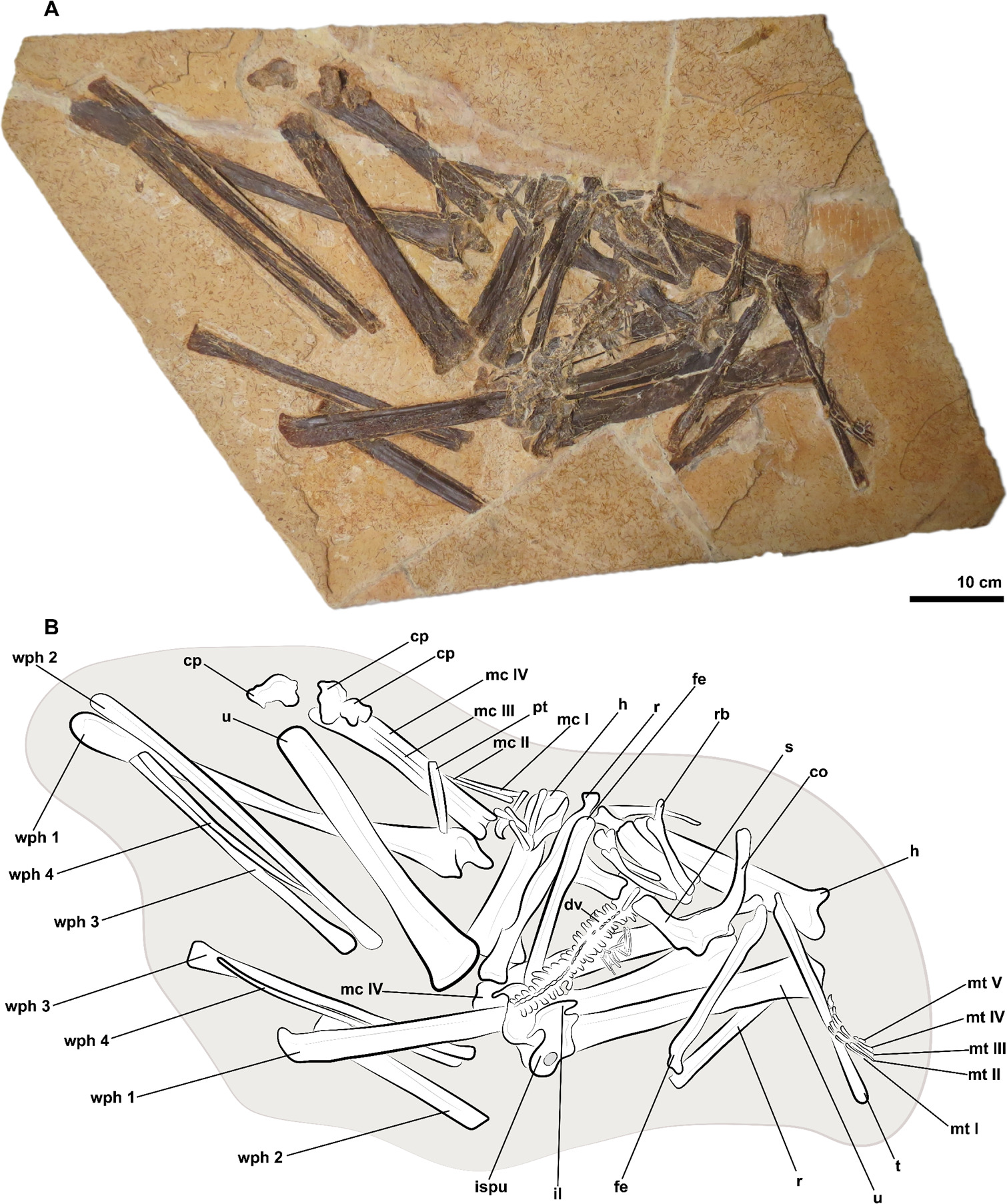
- Holotype specimen

Scientific classification
- Kingdom: Animalia
- Phylum: Chordata
- Class: Reptilia
- Order: †Pterosauria
- Suborder: †Pterodactyloidea
- Family: †Ornithocheiridae
- Genus: †Arthurdactylus; Frey and Martill, 1994
- Species: †A. conandoylei

Binomial name
- †Arthurdactylus conandoylei Frey and Martill, 1994

Synonyms
- Arthurdactylus conan-doylei Frey and Martill, 1994; Arthurdactylus conandoyli [lapsus] Martill and Frey, 1998

= Arthurdactylus =

Arthurdactylus Temporal range: Albian

Genus of ornithocheirid pterosaur from the Early Cretaceous

Arthurdactylus is a genus of pterodactyloid pterosaur from the Early Cretaceous Crato Formation of northeastern Brazil. It was a medium-sized pterosaur, with a wingspan of 4.5–4.6 metres (14.8–15.1 ft) and body mass of 15 kg (33 lb).

In 1994 it was named by Eberhard Frey and David Martill in honor of Arthur Conan Doyle, who featured large reptilian pterosaurs in his novel The Lost World, about a professor finding prehistoric animals still alive on a plateau in South-America. They first spelled the species name as Arthurdactylus conan-doylei, thus with a forbidden diacritic sign, and themselves carried out the necessary emendation to conandoylei in 1998. The holotype is SMNK 1133 PAL, a reasonably complete skeleton, lacking only a skull, neck, sternum and some caudal vertebrae. The specimen, adult or nearly so, was preserved on a plate and is slightly crushed. Arthurdactylus had, compared to the torso length of 22 centimetres, relatively long wings and especially long wing fingers, perhaps much more so than any other pterodactyloid. The hind limbs are however, weakly developed.

The describers assigned Arthurdactylus to the Ornithocheiridae. According to Brazilian paleontologist Alexander Kellner, who uses this concept in a different sense, Arthurdactylus can be best indicated as closely related to the Anhangueridae

== See also ==
- Timeline of pterosaur research
- List of pterosaurs
- List of organisms named after famous people (born 1800–1899)
