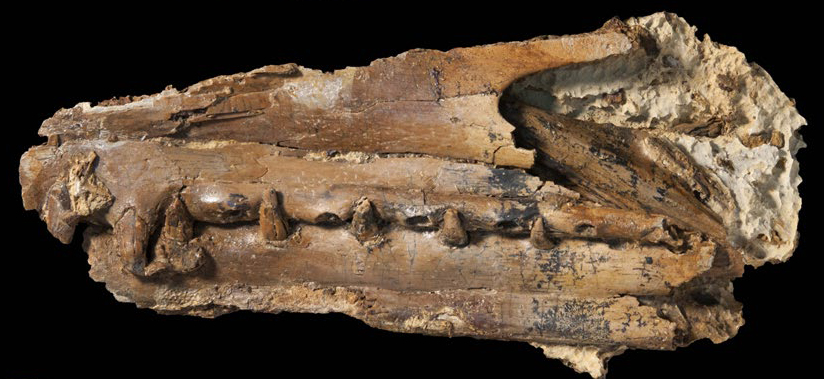
- Holotype specimen (QM F18896)

Scientific classification
- Kingdom: Animalia
- Phylum: Chordata
- Class: Reptilia
- Order: †Pterosauria
- Suborder: †Pterodactyloidea
- Family: †Anhangueridae
- Tribe: †Mythungini
- Genus: †Mythunga; Molnar and Thulborn, 2008

Type species
- †Mythunga camara Molnar and Thulborn, 2008

= Mythunga =

Mythunga Temporal range: Early Cretaceous, Albian

Genus of anhanguerid pterosaur

Mythunga is a potentially dubious genus of anhanguerid pterosaur known from the late Early Cretaceous (Albian age) Toolebuc Formation of Australia. The genus contains a single species, Mythunga camara, known from a partial skull. It is a close relative of Ferrodraco, another Australian anhanguerid.

== Discovery and naming ==
Mythunga is known from a partial skull, holotype QM F18896, found in April 1991 by Philip Gilmore in marine rocks of the late Albian-age Toolebuc Formation at Dunluce Station west of Hughenden, Queensland. Only the middle snout and corresponding parts of the lower jaws are known, including the rear of a left premaxilla, the lower parts of both maxillae, the rear dentaries and a right splenial. They were three-dimensionally preserved, associated in a chalk nodule. It represents a subadult individual. The fossil was prepared by Angela Hatch of the Queensland Museum, both by mechanical means and by an acid bath.

The type species Mythunga camara was named and described by Ralph Molnar and R. A. Thulborn in 2007/2008. The generic name is that of the constellation Orion in the local Aboriginal language. The specific name, from Latin camera, "room", refers to the camerate air spaces in the bone.

Mythunga was redescribed by Adele Pentland and Stephen Poropat in 2018, benefiting from further preparation of the specimen. At that time it was still the most completely known pterosaur of Australia. No more than twenty pterosaur fossils were known from that continent, most of them teeth and bone fragments.

== Description ==
The wingspan of Mythunga was estimated in 2007 at 4.7 metres (15 ft). However, that was done under the assumption that the first preserved teeth were located on the left premaxilla, which would imply that Mythunga was a relatively short-snouted form with a skull length of 50 to 80 centimetres (1.6 to 2.6 ft). In 2018, it was concluded that they had been confused with a maxillary tooth and a replacement tooth and that the skull length was likely between 80 centimetres (2.6 ft) and 1 metre (3.3 ft), with a corresponding wingspan of between 4 and 6 metres (13 and 20 ft).

In 2007, two autapomorphies (unique derived traits) were suggested. Firstly, the teeth in the rear dentary of the lower jaw were relatively tall (half the depth of the supporting bone at that point). Secondly, the three hindmost maxillary teeth were widely spaced. In 2018, however, the first trait was rejected because it could not be reliably determined where the dentary ended. Another autapomorphy was proposed: the outer sides of the jaws are undulating due to bulging tooth sockets.

The entire piece has a preserved length of 263 millimetres (10.4 in). As with most pterosaurs, the snout was hollow, with a supporting internal boxwork of bone, as could be observed at breaks. The jugal bone apparently extended to a point below the front of the large skull opening, the nasoantorbital fenestra. There are at least eight teeth in each maxilla. That is also the minimum number in the dentary. The teeth are relatively short, conical, and moderately recurved. Their cross-section is oval. They are widely spaced at equal distances.

== Classification ==
In 2007, Mythunga was provisionally thought to belong to a group of plesiomorphic, and thus possibly basal, pterodactyloids: the Archaeopterodactyloidea. In 2010, Kellner et al. placed Mythunga within the Anhangueridae. In 2018, it was recovered by a cladistic analysis in the Anhangueria.

The results of a phylogenetic analysis by Pentland et al. in 2019 recovered Mythunga as a member of the family Ornithocheiridae, more precisely within the subfamily Ornithocheirinae as the sister taxon of Ferrodraco. However, a study made by Borja Holgado and Rubi Pêgas in 2020 again recovered Mythunga within the family Anhangueridae, more precisely within the subfamily Tropeognathinae. In 2023, Richards et al. published a revised diagnosis of the related Thapunngaka, where they also erected the clade Mythungini. The clade comprises all Australian tropeognathines, including Mythunga, the type genus of said clade.

Topology 1: First analysis by Pentland et al. (2019).

- Anhangueria
  - Guidraco
  - - - - Brasileodactylus
        - Ludodactylus
      - - Cearadactylus
        - Ornithocheirae
          - Anhangueridae
            - Liaoningopterus
            - Anhanguera
          - Ornithocheiridae
            - Tropeognathus
            - Ornithocheirinae
              - Coloborhynchus
              - - Ornithocheirus
                - - Ferrodraco
                  - Mythunga

Topology 2: Richards et al. (2023).

- Anhangueria
  - Hamipteridae
  - Anhangueridae
    - - Coloborhynchinae
      - Anhanguerinae
    - Tropeognathinae
      - Tropeognathini
        - Siroccopteryx
        - Tropeognathus
        - Amblydectes
      - Mythungini
        - Ferrodraco
        - Thapunngaka
        - Mythunga

In 2025, Pêgas suggested that Mythunga should be classified as a nomen dubium, as the author found none of the proposed diagnostic characters to be unique to this genus, and disagreed with using the tribe Mythungini. Pêgas therefore regarded the holotype specimen as an indeterminate tropeognathine. The phylogenetic analysis recovered Haliskia and Ferrodraco within Tropeognathinae, but Thapunngaka as the closest relative of Ornithocheirus outside Anhangueroidea, comprising the clade Targaryendraconia and the families Anhangueridae and Hamipteridae.

== See also ==
- List of pterosaur genera
- Timeline of pterosaur research
