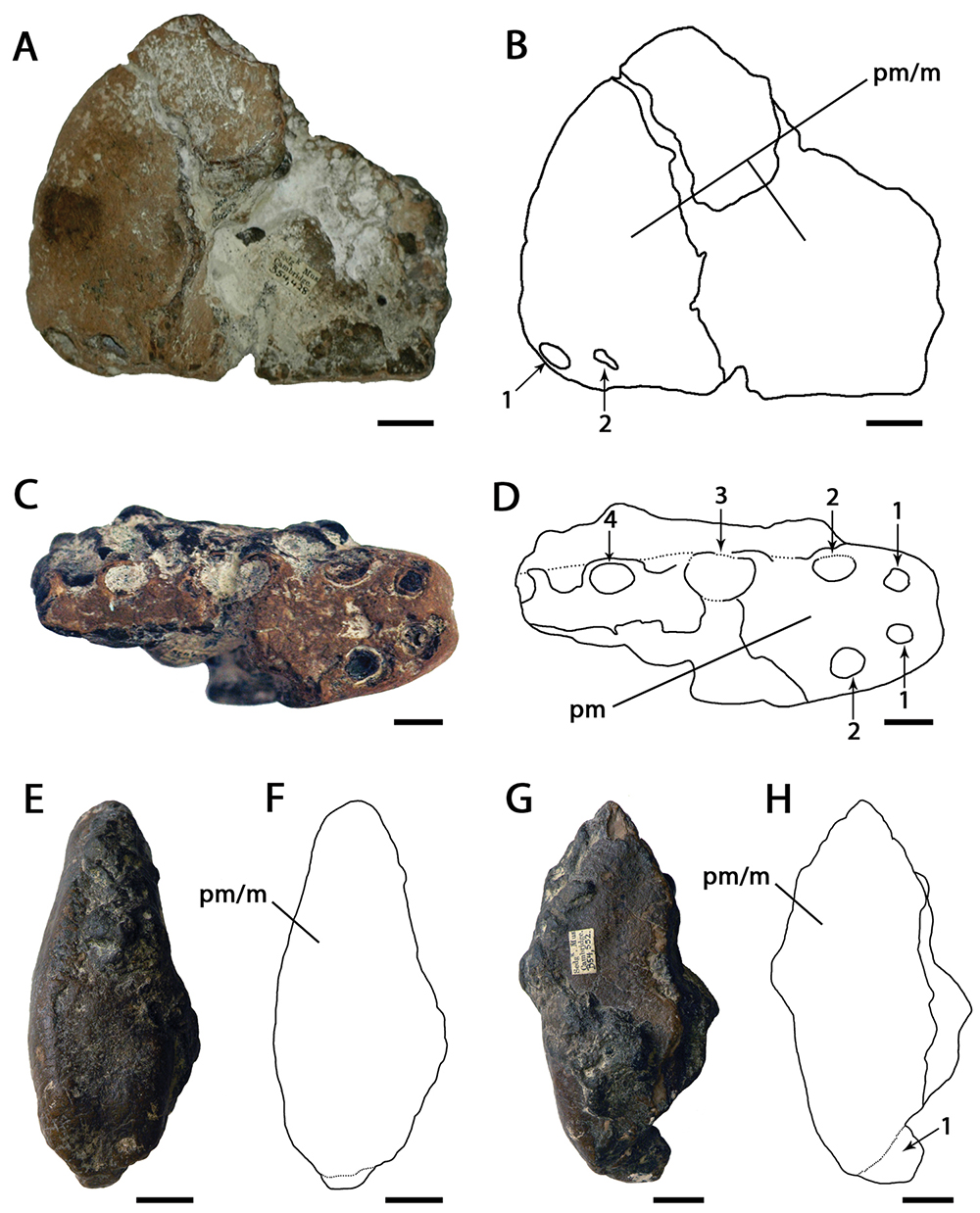
- Holotype of O. simus, CAMSM B54428, and referred specimen CAMSM B54552 (holotype of the junior synonym O. platyrhinus)

Scientific classification
- Kingdom: Animalia
- Phylum: Chordata
- Class: Reptilia
- Order: †Pterosauria
- Suborder: †Pterodactyloidea
- Family: †Ornithocheiridae
- Subfamily: †Ornithocheirinae; Seeley, 1870
- Genus: †Ornithocheirus; Seeley, 1869

Type species
- †Ornithocheirus simus Owen, 1861

Species
- †O. simus (Owen, 1861)

Synonyms
- Pterodactylus simus Owen, 1861; Criorhynchus simus Owen, 1874; Ornithocheirus platyrhinus Seeley, 1870

= Ornithocheirus =

Ornithocheirus Temporal range: Early Cretaceous, 105–103.54 Ma

Genus of ornithocheirid pterosaur from the Early Cretaceous

Ornithocheirus (from Ancient Greek "ὄρνις", meaning bird, and "χεῖρ", meaning hand) is a pterosaur genus known from fragmentary fossil remains uncovered from sediments in the United Kingdom and possibly Morocco.

Several species have been referred to the genus, most of which are now considered as dubious species, or members of different genera, and the genus is now often considered to include only the type species, Ornithocheirus simus. Species have been referred to Ornithocheirus from the mid-Cretaceous period of North America, Europe and South America, but O. simus is known mostly from the United Kingdom, though a specimen referred to O. cf. simus is also known from the Late Cretaceous Kem Kem Group of Morocco.

Because O. simus was originally named based on poorly preserved fossil material, the genus Ornithocheirus has suffered enduring problems of zoological nomenclature.

Fossil remains of Ornithocheirus have been recovered mainly from the Cambridge Greensand of England, dating to the beginning of the Albian stage of the early Cretaceous period, about 110 million years ago. Additional fossils from the Santana Formation of Brazil are sometimes classified as species of Ornithocheirus, but have also been placed in their own genera, most notably Tropeognathus.

== Discovery and naming ==
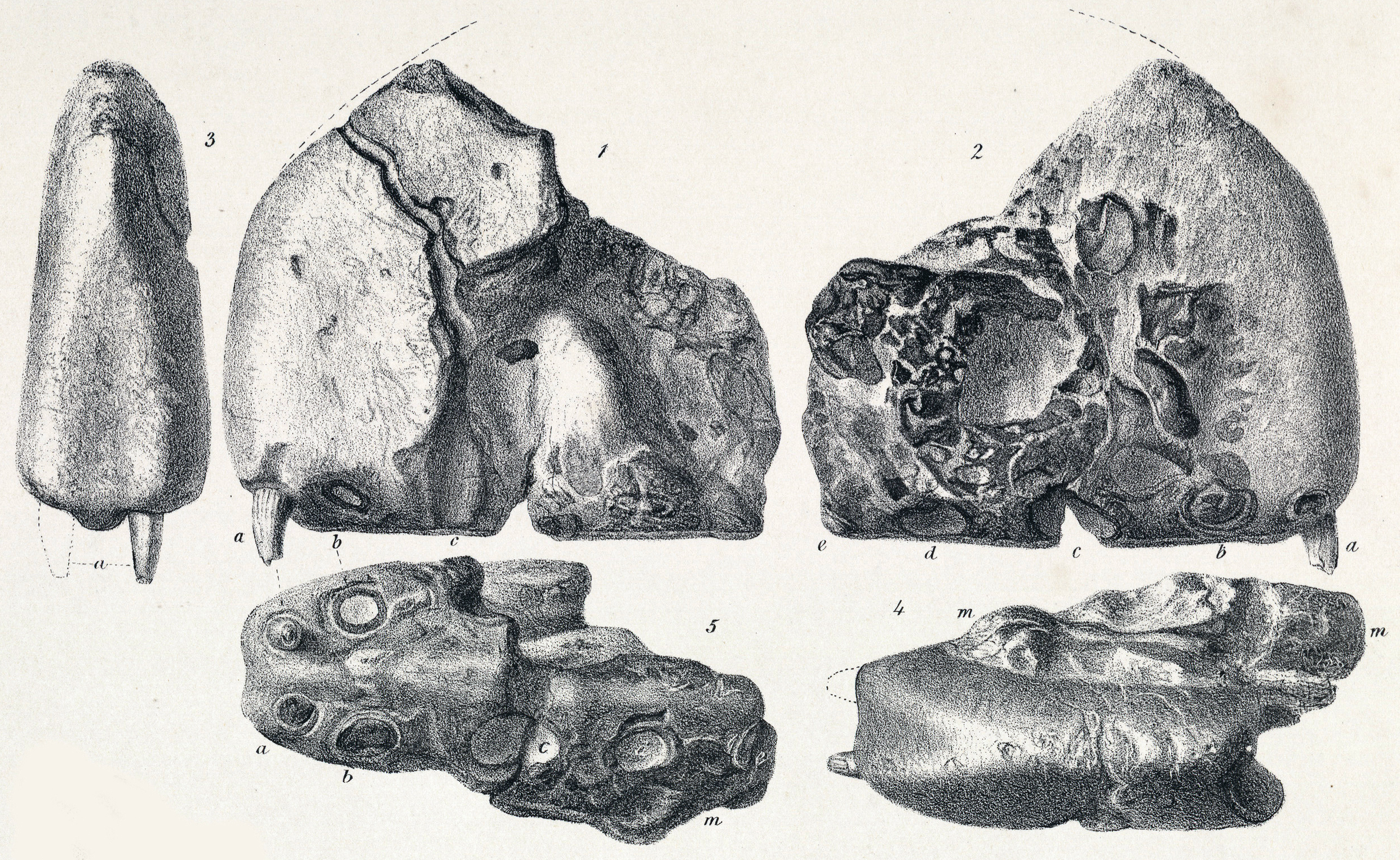
Lithograph of the holotype, showing a tooth which perhaps did not belong with the specimen, and is now lost

During the 19th century, in England many fragmentary pterosaur fossils were found in the Cambridge Greensand, a layer from the early Cretaceous, that had originated as a sandy seabed. Decomposing pterosaur cadavers, floating on the sea surface, had gradually lost individual bones that sank to the bottom of the sea. Water currents then moved the bones around, eroding and polishing them, until they were at last covered by more sand and fossilised. Even the largest of these remains were damaged and difficult to interpret. They had been assigned to the genus Pterodactylus, as was common for any pterosaur species described in the early and middle 19th century.

Young researcher Harry Govier Seeley was commissioned to bring order to the pterosaur collection of the Sedgwick Museum in Cambridge. He soon concluded that it was best to create a new genus for the Cambridge Greensand material that he named Ornithocheirus (meaning "bird hand"), as he in this period still considered pterosaurs to be the direct ancestors of birds, and assumed the hand of the genus to represent a transitional stage in the evolution towards the bird hand. To distinguish the best pieces in the collection, and partly because they had already been described as species by other scientists. Between the years 1869 and 1870, Seeley each gave them a separate species name: O. simus, O. woodwardi, O. oxyrhinus, O. carteri, O. platyrhinus, O. sedgwickii, O. crassidens, O. capito, O. eurygnathus, O. reedi, O. cuvieri, O. scaphorhynchus, O. brachyrhinus, O. colorhinus, O. dentatus, O. denticulatus, O. enchorhynchus, O. xyphorhynchus, O. fittoni, O. nasutus, O. polyodon, O. tenuirostris, O. machaerorhynchus, O. platystomus, O. microdon, O. oweni and O. huxleyi, thus 27 in total. As yet Seeley did not designate a type species.

When Seeley published his conclusions in his 1870 book The Ornithosauria, this provoked a reaction by the leading British paleontologist of his day, Sir Richard Owen. Owen was not an evolutionist and he therefore considered the name Ornithocheirus to be inappropriate; he also thought it was possible to distinguish two main types within the material, based on differences in snout form and tooth position — the best fossils consisted of jaw fragments. In 1874, he created two new genera: Coloborhynchus and Criorhynchus. Coloborhynchus (meaning "maimed beak") which comprised a new type species called Coloborhynchus clavirostris, as well as two other species reassigned from Ornithocheirus: C. sedgwickii and C. cuvieri. Criorhynchus (meaning "ram beak") consisted entirely of former Ornithocheirus species: the type species, Criorhynchus simus, and furthermore such as C. eurygnathus, C. capito, C. platystomus, C. crassidens and C. reedi.

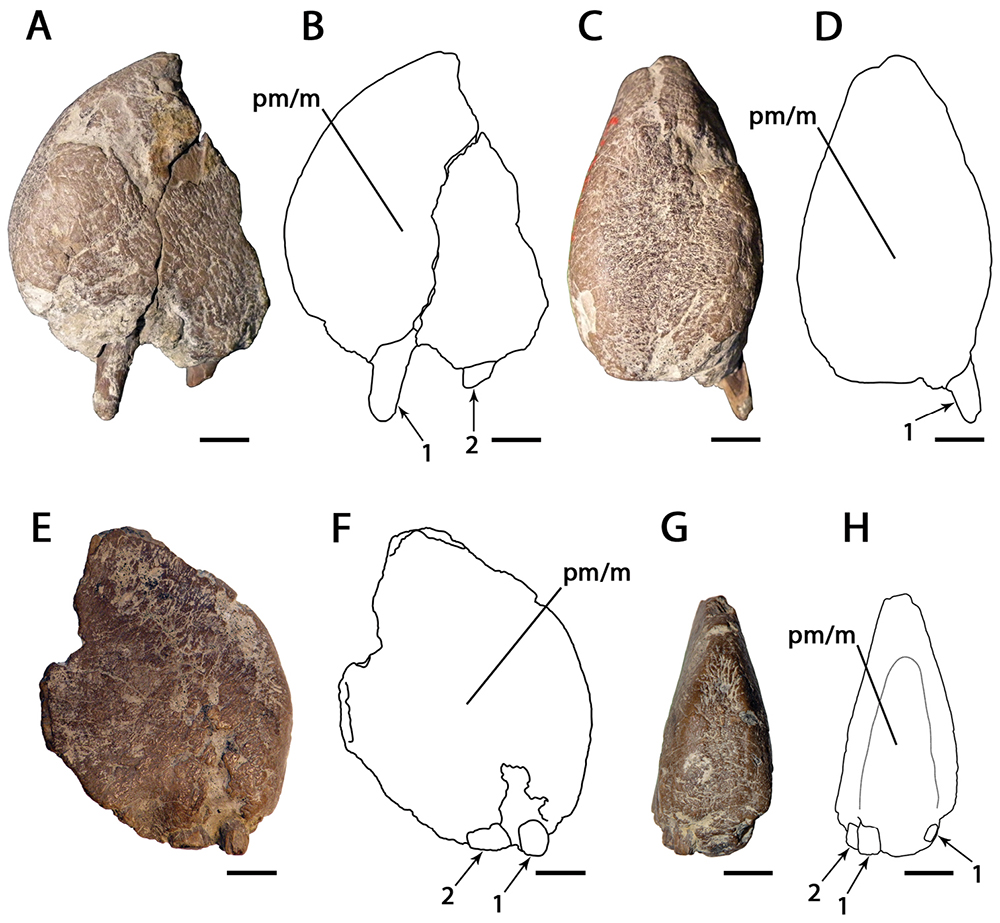
Referred specimens MANCH L10832 and NHMUK PV OR 35412

Seeley did not accept Owen's position. In 1881 he designated O. simus the type species of Ornithocheirus and named a new separate species called O. bunzeli. In 1888, Edwin Tulley Newton reassigned several existing species names into Ornithocheirus, which created new combinations: O. clavirostris, O. daviesii, O. sagittirostris, O. validus, O. giganteus, O. clifti, O. diomedeus, O. nobilis, O. curtus, O. macrorhinus and O. hlavaci. He also reassigned the species O. umbrosus and O. harpyia into Ornithocheirus, which were formerly species given to the genus Pteranodon by Edward Drinker Cope back in 1872.

In 1914 Reginald Walter Hooley made a new attempt to structure the large number of species. Hooley synonymized Owen's Criorhynchus to Ornithocheirus, in which he also sunk Coloborhynchus into that genus, meaning that the only generic name he kept was Ornithocheirus. To allow for a greater differentiation, Hooley created two new genera, again based on jaw form: Lonchodectes and Amblydectes. The genus Lonchodectes (meaning "lance biter") consisted of the former species Pterodactylus compressirostris, and Pterodactylus giganteus, which were reassigned as Lonchodectes compressirostris, the type species, and Lonchodectes giganteus, in addition, Hooley also named a new separate species called L. daviesii. The genus Amblydectes (meaning "blunt biter") also consisted of three species: A. platystomus, A. crassidens and A. eurygnathus. Hooley's classification however, was rarely applied later in the century, and therefore paleontologists weren't aware of it, and kept subsuming all the poorly preserved and confusing material under the name Ornithocheirus. In 1964, a Russian-language overview of Pterosauria designated the species Lonchodectes compressirostris, which was identified as Pterodactylus compressirostris in the overview, as the type species of Ornithocheirus, which was then followed by Kuhn in 1967, and Wellnhofer in 1978, yet those authors weren't aware that back in 1881, Seeley made already made the species P. simus as the type species of Ornithocheirus, in which defined the new combination of O. simus.

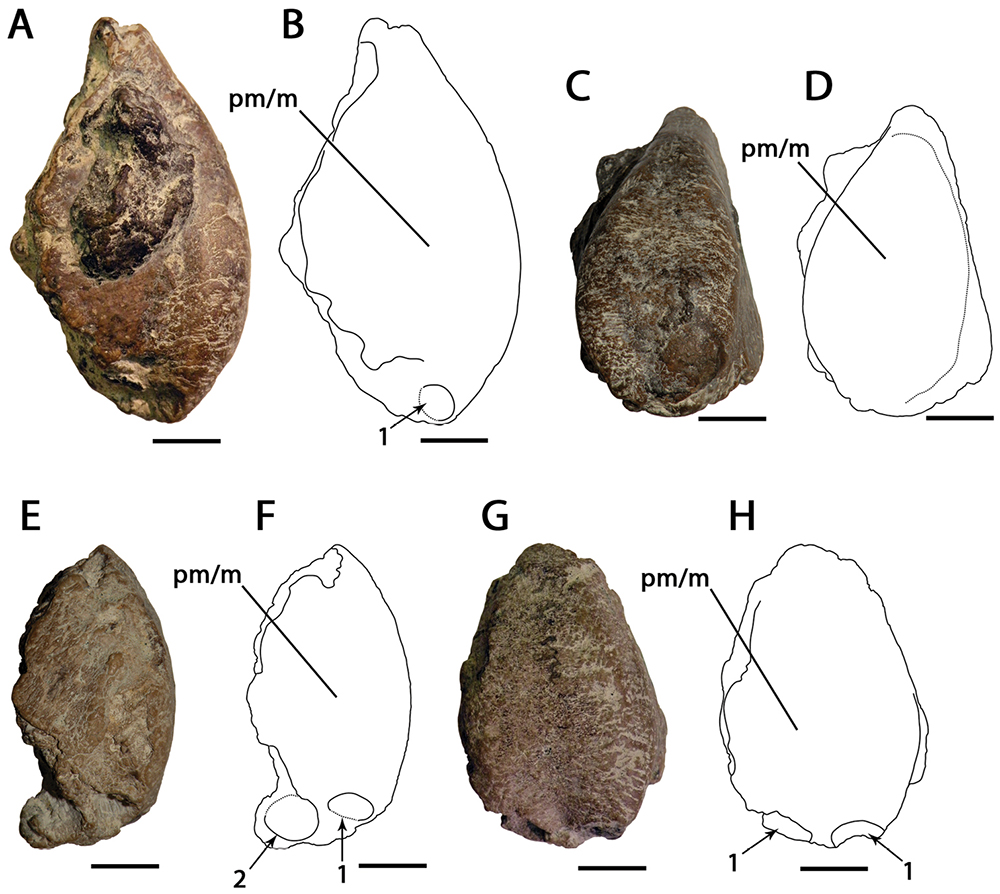
Referred specimens CAMSM 54429 and CAMSM 54677

From the seventies onwards many new pterosaur fossils were found in Brazil in deposits slightly older than the Cambridge Greensand, 110 million years old. Unlike the English material, these new finds included some of the best preserved large pterosaur skeletons and several new genera names were given to them, such as Anhanguera. This situation caused a renewed interest in the Ornithocheirus material and the validity of the several names based on it, for it might be possible that it could by more detailed studies be established that the Brazilian pterosaurs were actually junior synonyms of the European types. Several European researchers concluded that this was indeed the case. Unwin revived Coloborhynchus and Michael Fastnacht Criorhynchus, each author ascribing Brazilian species to these genera. However, in 2000 Unwin stated that Criorhynchus could not be valid. Referring to Seeley's designation of 1881 he considered Ornithocheirus simus, holotype CAMSM B.54428, to be the type species. This also made it possible to revive Lonchodectes, using as type the former O. compressirostris, which then became L. compressirostris.

As a result, though over forty species have been named in the genus Ornithocheirus over the years, only O. simus is currently considered valid by all pterosaur researchers. The species Tropeognathus mesembrinus, which was named by Peter Wellnhofer in 1987, was assigned to Ornithocheirus by David Unwin in 2003, making Tropeognathus a junior synonym. In 1989 however, Alexander Kellner considered it as an Anhanguera mesembrinus, then as a Coloborhynchus mesembrinus by André Veldmeijer in 1998 and as a Criorhynchus mesembrinus by Michael Fastnacht in 2001. Even earlier, in 2001, Unwin had referred the "Tropeognathus" material to O. simus in which was followed by Veldmeijer; however, Veldmeijer rejected O. simus as the type species in favor of O. compressirostris (alternately Lonchodectes), and he used the names Criorhynchus simus and Criorhynchus mesembrinus instead.

=== Formerly assigned species ===
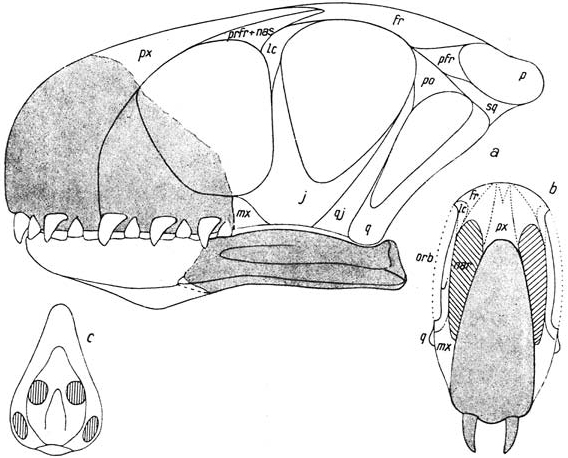
1919 reconstruction of the holotype by von Arthaber

In 2013, Rodrigues and Kellner found Ornithocheirus to be monotypic, containing only O. simus, and placed most other species in other genera, or declared them nomina dubia. They also considered O. platyrhinus a junior synonym of O. simus.

Misassigned species:

- O. compressirostris (Hooley, 1914) = Pterodactylus compressirostris, Owen, 1851 [now classified as Lonchodectes]
- O. crassidens (Seeley, 1870) = [now classified as Amblydectes]
- O. cuvieri (Seeley, 1870) = Pterodactylus cuvieri, Bowerbank, 1851 [now classified as Cimoliopterus]
- O. curtus (Hooley, 1914) = Pterodactylus curtus, Owen, 1874
- O. giganteus (Owen, 1879) = Pterodactylus giganteus, Bowerbank, 1846 [now classified as Lonchodraco]
- "O." hilsensis (Koken, 1883) = indeterminate Neotheropoda
- O. mesembrinus (Wellnhofer, 1987) = Tropeognathus mesembrinus, Wellnfofer, 1987
- O. nobilis (Owen, 1869) = Pterodactylus nobilis, Owen 1869
- O. sagittirostris (Seeley, 1874) = [now classified as Serradraco]
- O. simus (Owen, 1861) = [originally Pterodactylus] (type)
- O. sedgwicki (Owen, 1859) = Pterodactylus sedgwickii, Owen 1859 [now classified as Aerodraco]
- "O." wiedenrothi (Wild, 1990) = [now classified as Targaryendraco]

Cimoliornis diomedeus, Cretornis hlavatschi, and Palaeornis clifti, originally misidentified as birds, were once referred to Ornithocheirus in the past, but recent papers have found them to be distinct; Cimoliornis may be closer to azhdarchoidea, Cretornis is a valid genus of azhdarchid, and Palaeornis was shown to be a lonchodectid in 2009. O. buenzeli (Bunzel 1871, often misspelled and incorrectly attributed as O. bunzeli, Seeley 1881), cited in the past as evidence of Late Cretaceous ornithocheirids, has since been re-identified as a likely azhdarchid as well.

== Description ==
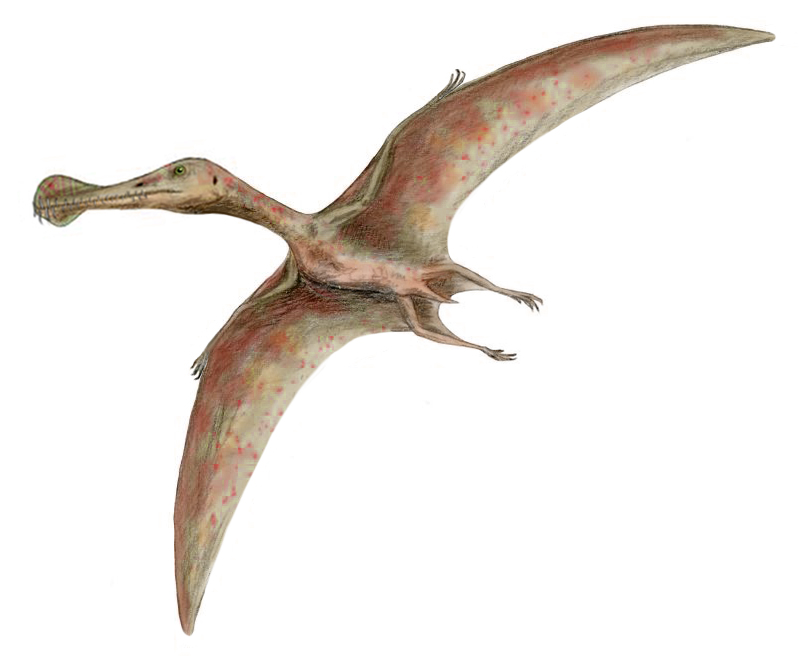
Life restoration

The type species, Ornithocheirus simus, is only known from fragmentary jaw tips. It bore a distinctive convex "keeled" crest on its snout similar to its relatives. Ornithocheirus had relatively narrow jaw tips compared to the related Coloborhynchus and Tropeognathus, which had prominently-expanded rosettes of teeth, as well as a more developed "keeled" crest compared to Ornithocheirus. Another feature that made Ornithocheirus unique and unlike its relatives, was that its teeth of were mostly vertical, rather than set at an outward-pointing angle.

It was believed in the past that Ornithocheirus was one of the largest pterosaurs to have existed, with a wingspan possibly measuring 40 feet (12.2 m) wide. However, this is a highly exaggerated number, as the animal's wingspan likely measured 15 to 20 feet (4.5 to 6.1 m) wide, which would make it a medium-sized pterosaur. A related species called Tropeognathus had a wingspan measuring about 27 feet (8.2 m) wide, making it the largest toothed pterosaur known. In 2022, Gregory S. Paul estimated that Ornithocheirus had a wingspan of 5 m (16 ft) and a body mass of 20 kg (44 lb).

== Classification ==
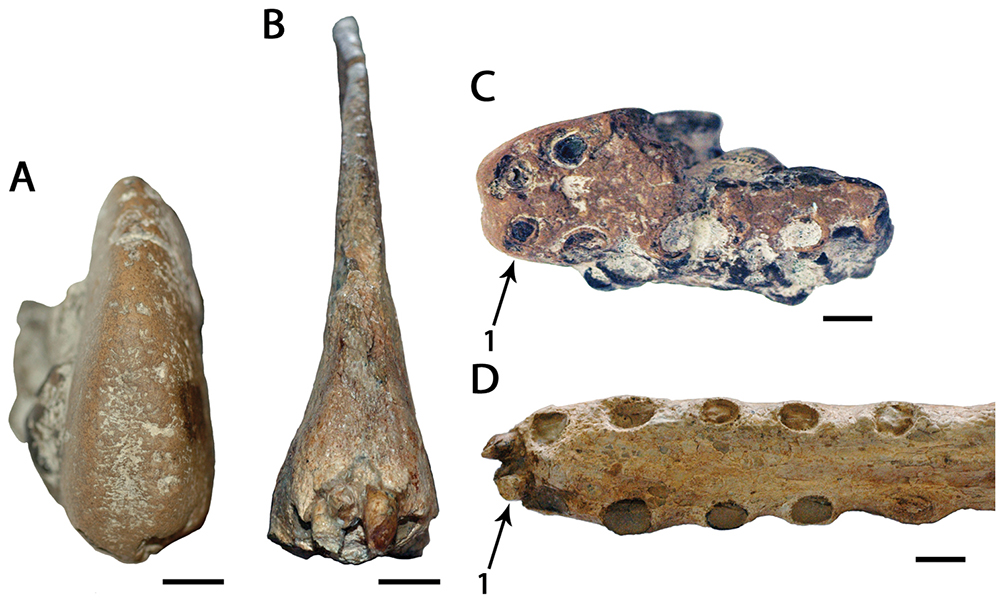
Holotypes of O. simus (A and C) and Tropeognathus mesembrinus (B and D)

A topology made by Andres and Myers in 2013 placed Ornithocheirus within the family Ornithocheiridae in a more derived position than Tropeognathus, but in a more basal position than Coloborhynchus, and the family itself is placed within the more inclusive clade Ornithocheirae. In 2019, Pêgas et al. found Ornithocheirus to be in a basal member of the clade Ornithocheirae, reclassifying all other snout-crested pterosaurs in the family Anhangueridae. Their cladogram is shown on the right.

Topology 1: Andres & Myers (2013).

- Ornithocheirae
  - Anhangueridae
    - Liaoningopterus gui
    - - Anhanguera araripensis
      - - Anhanguera blittersdorffi
        - - Anhanguera piscator
          - Anhanguera santanae
  - Ornithocheiridae
    - Tropeognathus mesembrinus
    - - Ornithocheirus simus
      - - Coloborhynchus clavirostris
        - Coloborhynchus wadleighi

Topology 2: Pêgas et al. (2019).

- Ornithocheirae
  - Ornithocheirus simus
  - - Targaryendraconia
      - Targaryendraconidae
      - Cimoliopteridae
    - Anhangueria
      - Hamipteridae
        - Hamipterus tianshanensis
        - Iberodactylus andreui
      - Anhangueridae
        - Tropeognathus mesembrinus
        - Coloborhynchinae
        - Anhanguerinae

In a 2025 phylogenetic analysis, Thapunngaka was recovered as the closest relative of Ornithocheirus. The results by Pêgas (2025) are displayed in the cladogram below:

- Ornithocheiriformes
  - - Ornithocheiridae
      - Thapunngaka
      - - Ornithocheirus
        - FSAC-KK 5025
          (Kem Kem beds, O. cf. simus)
  - - Anhangueroidea
      - Targaryendraconia
        - Targaryendraconidae
        - Cimoliopteridae
      - Anhangueria
        - Hamipteridae
          - Iberodactylus
          - Hamipterus
        - Anhangueridae
          ⊞
          - Tropeognathinae
            - Tropeognathus
            - - - Haliskia
                - Ferrodraco
              - - Aerodraco
                - - Akharhynchus
                  - Siroccopteryx
          - - Coloborhynchinae
              - Coloborhynchus
              - - Uktenadactylus spp.
                - Nicorhynchus spp.
            - Anhanguerinae
              - - Caulkicephalus
                - - Guidraco
                  - Ludodactylus
              - - Liaoningopterus
                - - - Brasileodactylus
                    - Maaradactylus
                  - Anhanguera spp.
          ⊟

== See also ==
- List of pterosaur genera
- Timeline of pterosaur research
- Pterosaur size

== Notes ==
- Haines, T., and Chambers, P. (2006). The Complete Guide to Prehistoric Life. Canada: Firefly Books Ltd.
