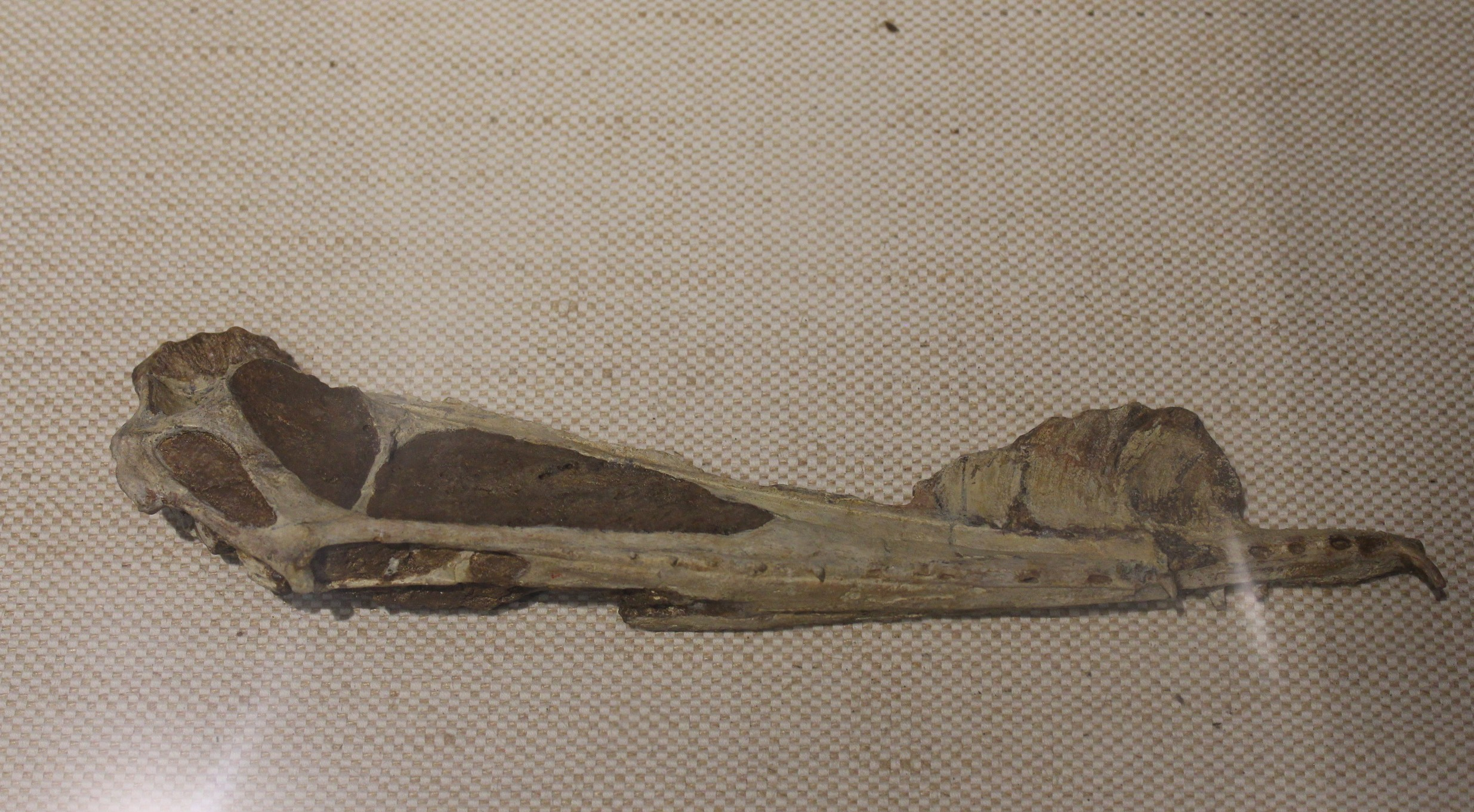
- Skull of Hamipterus on display at the Paleozoological Museum of China

Scientific classification
- Kingdom: Animalia
- Phylum: Chordata
- Class: Reptilia
- Order: †Pterosauria
- Suborder: †Pterodactyloidea
- Clade: †Anhangueria
- Clade: †Hamipteridae; Holgado et al., 2019

Type species
- †Hamipterus tianshanensis Wang et al., 2014

Genera
- †Hamipterus; †Iberodactylus

= Hamipteridae =

Hamipterids Temporal range: Early Cretaceous

Family of anhanguerian pterosaurs

Hamipteridae (or hamipterids) is a small family of anhanguerian pterosaurs known from the Early Cretaceous of China and Spain.

== Classification ==
The cladogram below follows the topology recovered by Pêgas et al. (2019). In the analysis, they assigned Hamipteridae as the sister taxon of the family Anhangueridae, both within the larger clade Anhangueria.

- Anhangueria
  - Hamipteridae
    - Hamipterus
    - Iberodactylus
  - Anhangueridae
    - Tropeognathus
    - Coloborhynchinae
      - Coloborhynchus
      - Siroccopteryx
      - Uktenadactylus
    - Anhanguerinae
      - - Caulkicephalus
        - Guidraco
        - Ludodactylus
      - - Anhanguera
        - Liaoningopterus
        - - Cearadactylus
          - Maaradactylus
