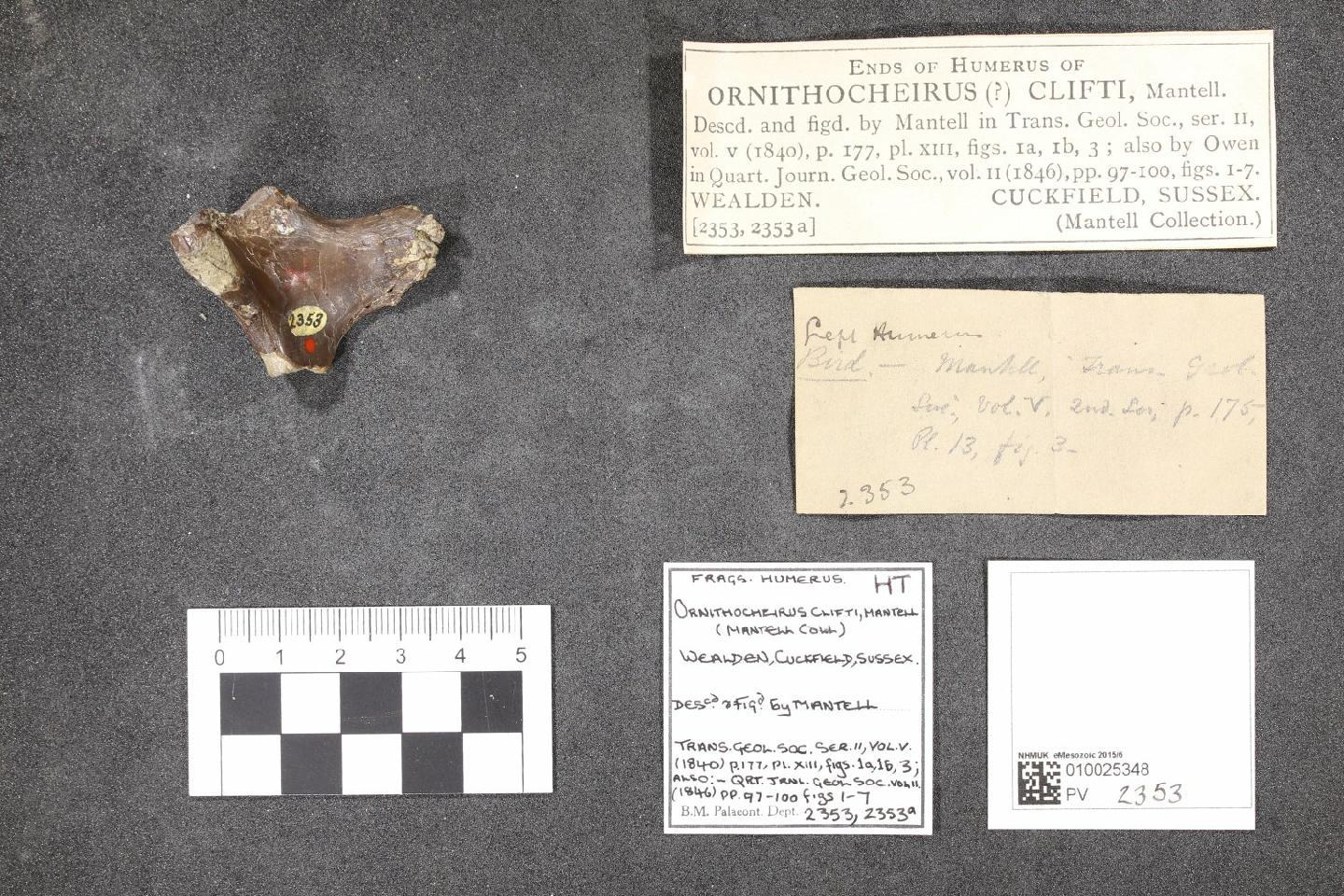
- Proximal end of the left holotype humerus

Scientific classification
- Kingdom: Animalia
- Phylum: Chordata
- Class: Reptilia
- Order: †Pterosauria
- Suborder: †Pterodactyloidea
- Clade: †Azhdarchoidea
- Clade: †Tapejaromorpha
- Genus: †Rexarthuria; Thomas & McDavid, 2026
- Species: †R. cliftii

Binomial name
- †Rexarthuria cliftii (Mantell, 1844)

Synonyms
- Palæornis cliftii Mantell, 1844; Pterodactylus cliftii (Mantell, 1844); Ornithocheirus clifti (Mantell, 1844); Pterodactylus ornis Giebel, 1847; Pterodactylus silvestris Owen, 1859

= Rexarthuria =

Rexarthuria Temporal range: Early Cretaceous, 135 Ma

Genus of pterosaur

Rexarthuria is an extinct genus of azhdarchoid pterosaur known from parts of a single humerus (upper arm bone) found in the early Cretaceous (Valanginian age) of the upper Tunbridge Wells Sand Formation in England. The genus contains a single species, Rexarthuria cliftii, originally placed in the genus Palaeornis, which is preoccupied by a bird.

== Discovery and naming ==
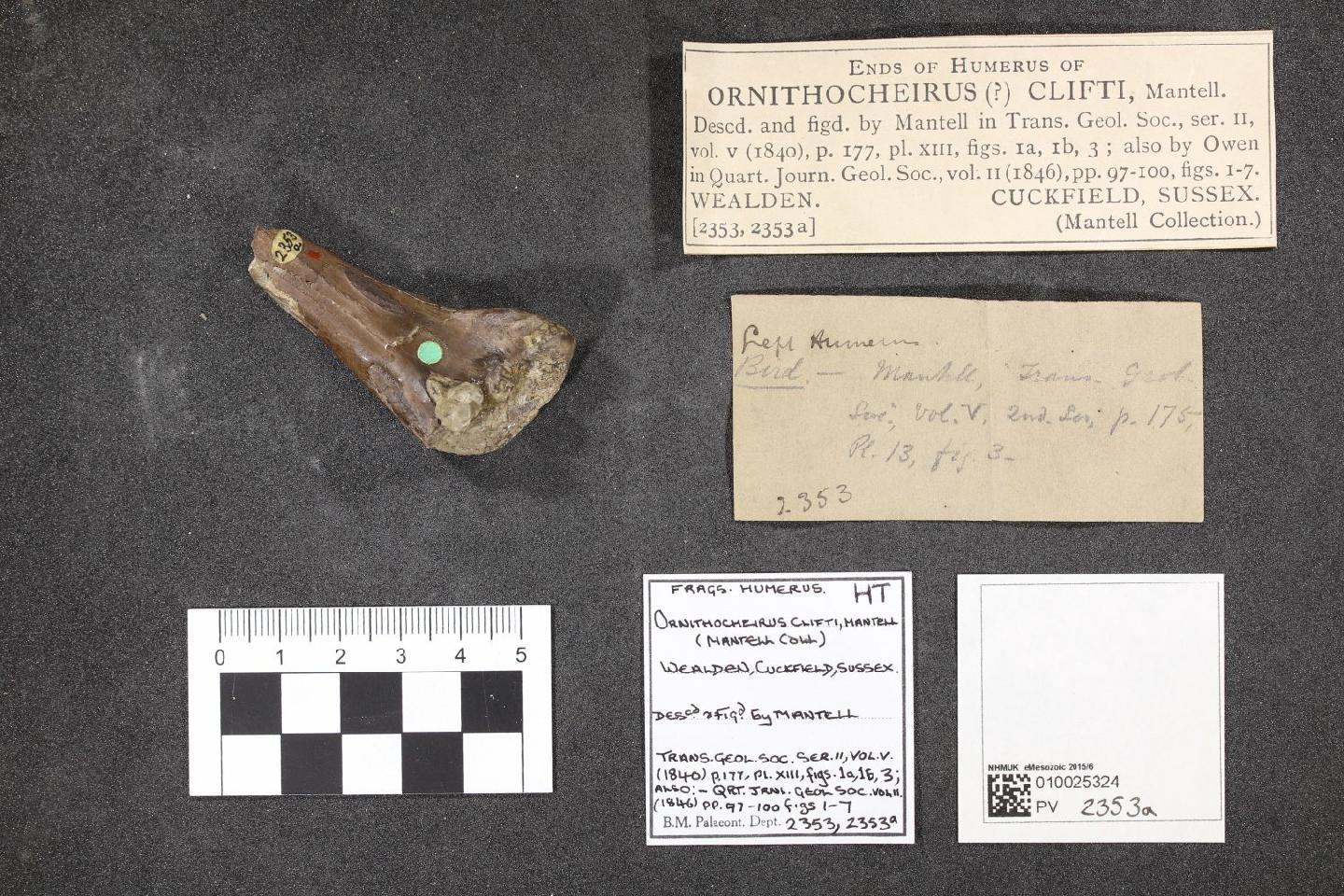
Distal end of the left holotype humerus

"Palaeornis" cliftii was one of the earliest pterosaur discoveries in England and has a long and complicated nomenclatural history. It was originally identified as a prehistoric bird by Gideon Mantell (1837, 1844), but was recognized as a pterosaur by Christoph Gottfried Andreas Giebel (1847) and Richard Owen (1846, 1859), who named it Pterodactylus ornis and P. silvestris respectively. Richard Lydekker (1888) and Reginald Walter Hooley (1914) tentatively referred it to Ornithocheirus, although the holotype NHMUK 2353/2353a does not overlap with the holotype of the Ornithocheirus type species. Peter Wellnhofer (1978) referred Palaeornis clifti to Ornithocheiridae incertae sedis.

Mark P. Witton et al. (2009) re-examined the type specimen and realized that "P." clifti is not an ornithocheirid, referring it to Lonchodectidae based on similarities to humeri assigned to Lonchodectes by Hooley (1914). Averianov (2012, 2014) referred the taxon to Azhdarchoidea indeterminate in his re-assessment of Ornithostoma. In 2025, Thomas and McDavid recovered it as a sister taxon of Tapejaridae.

The name Palaeornis had previously been used for a genus of parakeet (now considered a synonym of Psittacula) by Vigors in 1825. In 1848, Mantell used the name "Palæornithis" to refer to supposed bird bones from the Wealden Group. In 2009, Mark Witton and colleagues considered "Palæornithis" as a possible replacement name for "P." cliftii. In 2026, Thomas and McDavid redescribed the holotype of "P." cliftii and proposed Rexarthuria (lit. 'King Arthur') as a replacement genus name. They stated that "Palæornithis" was never explicitly mentioned as an intended replacement name or unambiguously based on the same specimen, so it cannot be treated available in accordance with the ICZN article 12.1. The specific name honours William Clift, the curator of the Hunterian Museum.
