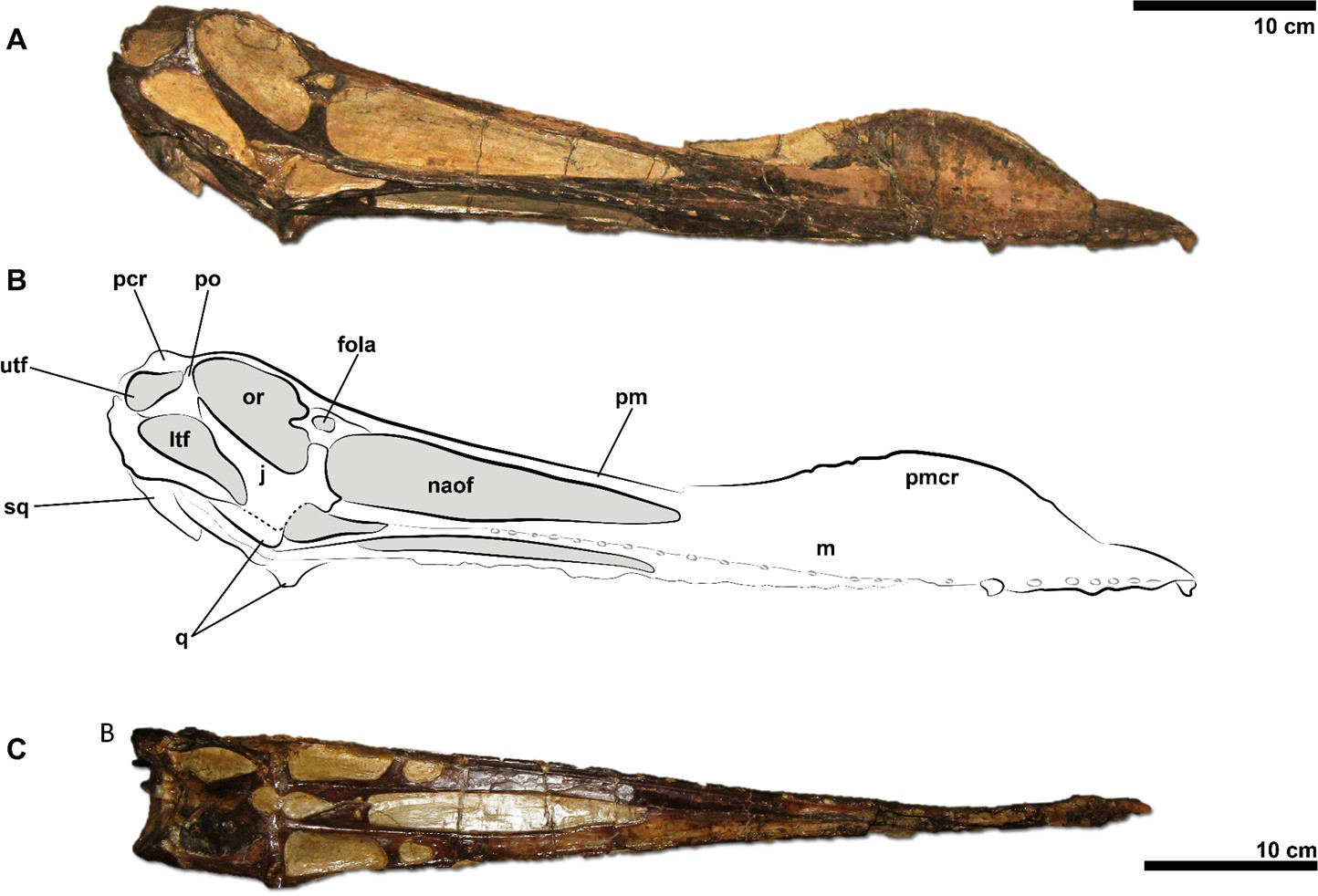
- A. blittersdorffi holotype skull (MN 4805-V)

Scientific classification
- Kingdom: Animalia
- Phylum: Chordata
- Class: Reptilia
- Order: †Pterosauria
- Suborder: †Pterodactyloidea
- Family: †Anhangueridae
- Subfamily: †Anhanguerinae
- Genus: †Anhanguera; Campos & Kellner 1985

Type species
- †Anhanguera blittersdorffi Campos & Kellner, 1985

Other species
- †A. piscator Kellner & Tomida, 2000; †A. robustus (Wellnhofer, 1987); †A. spielbergi (Veldmeijer, 2003)

Synonyms
- List of synonyms: Genus synonymy; "Pricesaurus" Martins-Neto, 1986 (nomen nudum) Synonyms of A. araripensis; Coloborhynchus araripensis (Wellnhofer, 1985); Santanadactylus araripensis Wellnhofer, 1985 Synonyms of A. piscator; Coloborhynchus piscator (Kellner & Tomida, 2000) Synonyms of A. robustus; Coloborhynchus robustus (Wellnhofer, 1987); Tropeognathus robustus Wellnhofer, 1987; Anhanguera piscator? Kellner & Tomida, 2000 Synonyms of A. santanae; Araripesaurus santanae Wellnhofer, 1985 Synonyms of A. spielbergi; Coloborhynchus spielbergi Veldmeijer, 2003; Maaradactylus spielbergi (Veldmeijer, 2003)

= Anhanguera =

Anhanguera Temporal range: Albian-Cenomanian, ~112–92.5 Ma

Genus of anhanguerid pterosaur from the Cretaceous period

Anhanguera (Portuguese: [ɐɲɐ̃ˈɡwɛɾɐ]) is a genus of pterodactyloid pterosaur known from the Early Cretaceous (Albian age, 112 to 100 million years ago) Romualdo Formation of Brazil (precisely in Araripe Basin) and the Late Cretaceous (Cenomanian age, 98 to 93 million years ago) Kem Kem Group of Morocco. This pterosaur is closely related to Ornithocheirus, but belongs in the family Anhangueridae. The generic name comes from the Tupi words añanga, meaning "spirit protector of the animals" + wera "bygone".

== Description ==
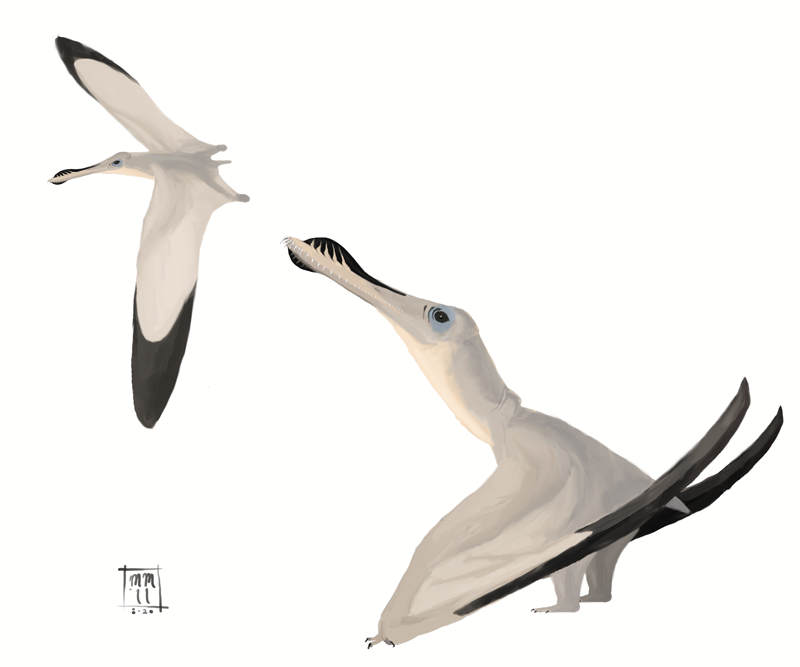
Life restoration of A. blittersdorffi

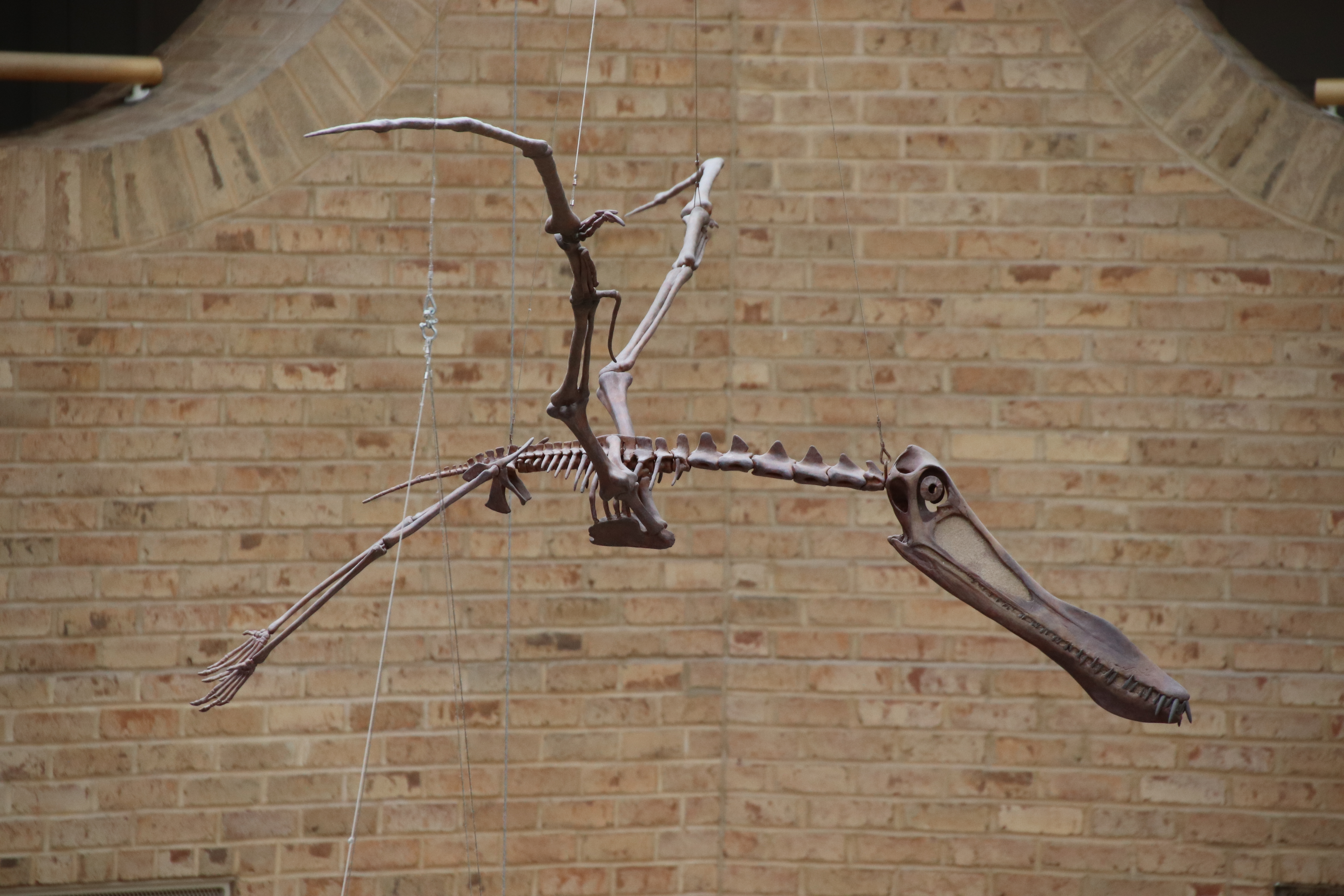
Mounted skeleton in Fernbank Museum

Anhanguera was a fish-eating animal with a wingspan of about 4.6 meters (15 ft). Like many other anhanguerids, Anhanguera had rounded crests at front of its upper and lower jaws, which were filled with angled, conical but curved teeth of various sizes and orientations. Like many of its relatives, the jaws were tapered in width, but expanded into a broad, spoon-shaped rosette at the tip. The jaw crests were not present in all Anhanguera: those with crests may be of different age and/or sex from those without, and the crests may be influenced by sexual selection. Anhanguera is distinguished from its relatives by subtle differences in the crest and teeth: unlike its close relatives Coloborhynchus and Ornithocheirus, the crest on the upper jaw of Anhanguera did not begin at the tip of the snout, but was set farther back on the skull. Like many pteranodontoids, (most notably the pteranodonts but also in anhanguerids such as Ludodactylus) Anhanguera had an additional crest protruding from the back of the skull. However, it was reduced to a small, blunt projection in these animals.

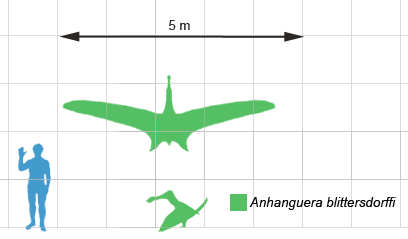
Size of A. blittersdorffi compared to a human

A study in 2003 showed that Anhanguera held its head at an angle to the ground due to its inner ear structure, which helped the animal detect its balance. Anhanguera had bony rings in their eye sockets, called scleral rings. These disks may have provided support to the pterosaur's eyes. Scleral rings are found in many extant species of vertebrates, including modern-day birds.

The dubious species, A. araripensis, has been described as similar in skull anatomy to other species of Anhanguera, and possibly Coloborhynchus, and the species is placed in either of these genera by various researchers. Like species referred to Coloborhynchus, the snout tip was blunt and bore two forward-projecting teeth that emerged higher on the jaw than the rest of the tooth row. As in most other anhanguerids, the species bore a large, rounded crest at the tip of the jaws. Like Coloborhynchus species, and unlike the type species of Anhanguera, the crest of A. araripensis emerged from the very tip of the blunted jaws, rather than further back on the jaw. However, unlike Coloborhynchus, A. araripensis lacked a dent or depression in the blunted jaw tip, and the teeth appear to have been smaller and more uniform in size.

== Classification ==
The type species, A. blittersdorfi, is based on a complete skull from the Romualdo Formation calcareous concretions (Santana Group) of the Ceará and Pernambuco states of Brazil. The species A. piscator, known from a nearly-complete skeleton, was at one point proposed to belong to the genus Coloborhynchus, but has more recently been placed back into Anhanguera by Andres and Myers. The species A. spielbergi was also previously assigned to Coloborhynchus. Pinheiro and Tassia (2017), considered Anhanguera robustus to be a nomen dubium, though Piazentin et al. (2025) considered it a valid species.

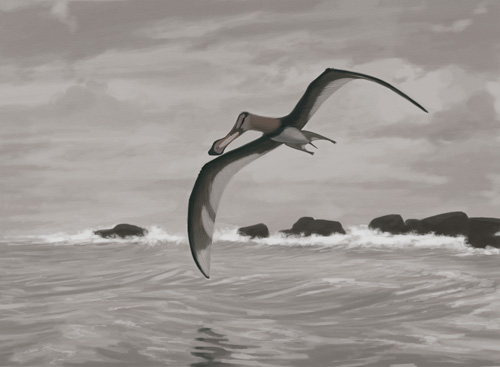
Restoration of A. piscator

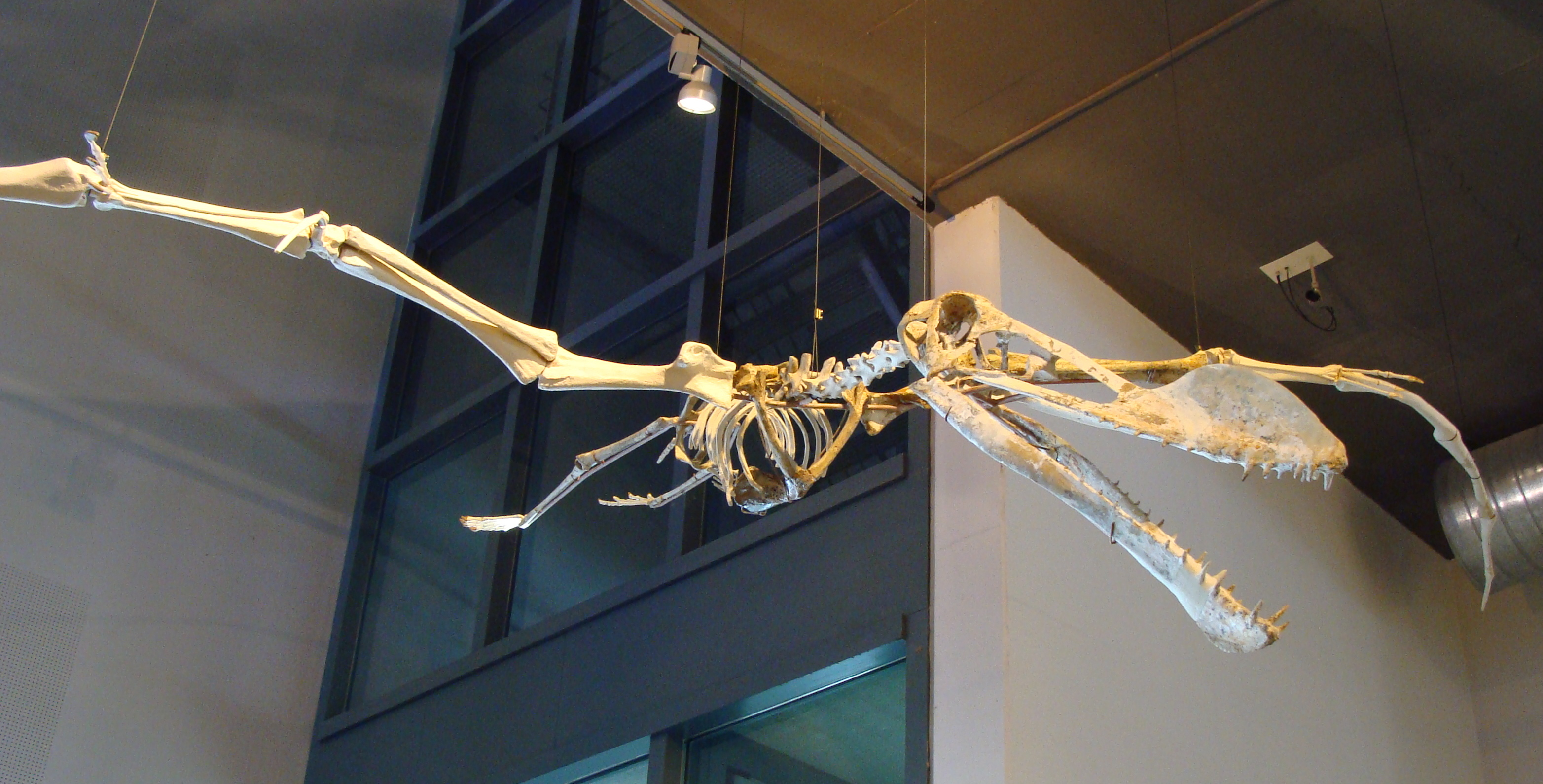
Skeletal mount of A. spielbergi

Below is a cladogram showing the phylogenetic placement of this genus within Pteranodontia from Andres and Myers (2013).

- Ornithocheirae
  - Anhangueridae
    - Liaoningopterus gui
    - Anhanguera
      - Anhanguera araripensis
      - - Anhanguera blittersdorffi
        - - Anhanguera piscator
          - Anhanguera santanae
  - Ornithocheiridae
    - Tropeognathus mesembrinus
    - - Ornithocheirus simus
      - - Coloborhynchus clavirostris
        - Coloborhynchus wadleighi

=== Former species and nomina dubia ===
Various other species have been assigned to Anhanguera, but all of them are either dubious or have been transferred to other genera. A 2017 review found A. araripensis, A. robustus, and A. santanae to be based on non-diagnostic material, and therefore were dubious.

- A. araripensis (Wellnhofer 1985) = Santanadactylus araripensis Wellnhofer 1985 [also classified as Coloborhynchus]
- A. cuvieri (Bowerbank 1851) = Ornithocheirus cuvieri = Pterodactylus cuvieri Bowerbank 1851 [now classified as Cimoliopterus]
- A. fittoni (Owen 1858) = Pterodactylus fittoni Owen 1858
- A. ligabuei (Dalla Vecchia 1993) = Cearadactylus ligabuei Dalla Vecchia 1993 [also classified as Coloborhynchus or Cearadactylus]
- A. santanae (Wellnhofer 1985) = Araripesaurus santanae Wellnhofer 1985

== "Pricesaurus" ==
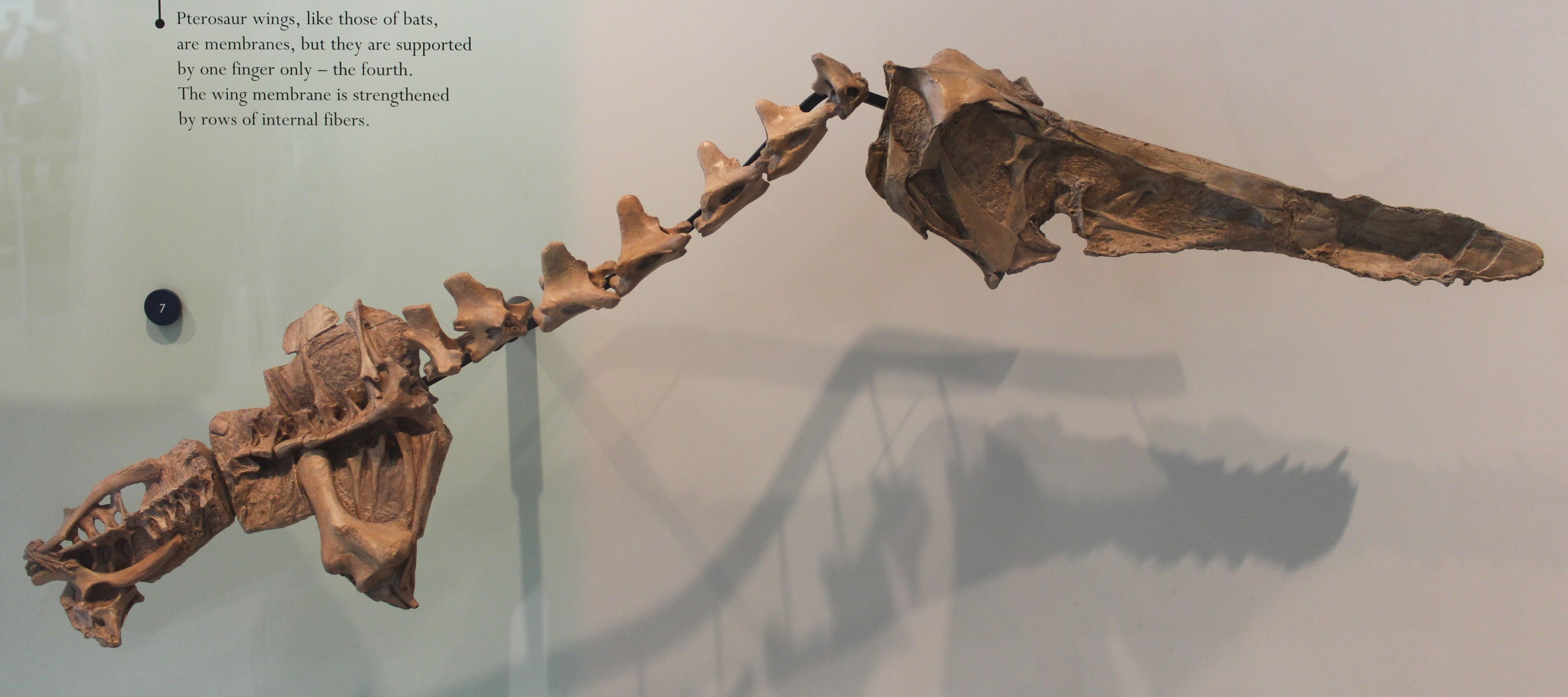

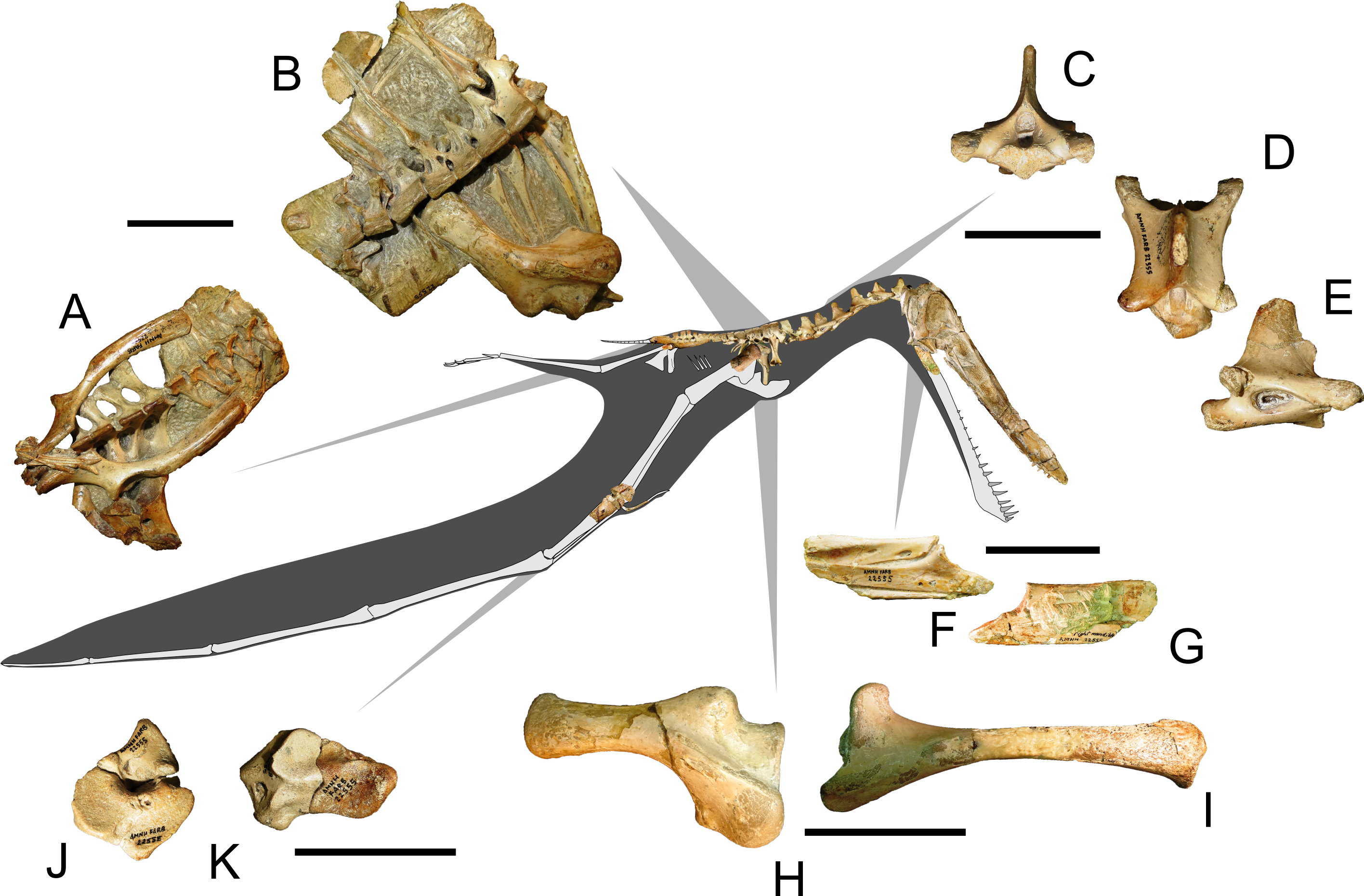
Anhanguerid skeleton AMNH 22555, formerly assigned to A. santanae.

In 1986, Rafael Gioia Martins-Neto reported the find of a pterosaur that he named "Pricesaurus megalodon" in a lecture during the 38th annual meeting of Sociedade Brasileira para o Progresso da Ciência at São Paulo. The abstracts of the congress were subsequently published that year in the magazine Ciência e Cultura. The generic name honors Llewellyn Ivor Price. The specific name is derived from Greek μέγας, megas, "large", and ὀδών, odon, "tooth". The species was based on two syntypes that Martins-Neto considered to have originated from a single individual animal, even though he had separately acquired them from commercial fossil dealers in two nodules: specimen CPCA 3592, a 9 centimeters (3.5 in) long point of a snout, and specimen CPCA 3591, an 18 centimeters (7.1 in) long middle part of a skull. Pricesaurus is thus exclusively known from cranial material. Both specimens were probably found in the Romualdo Member of the Araripe Basin and both are part of the collection of the Centro de Pesquisas Paleontológicas da Chapada do Araripe.

Martins-Neto provided a diagnosis of four distinctive traits: the breadth of the premaxillae; the closely positioned teeth; the deep premaxillary tooth sockets; and the rounded front of the fenestra nasoantorbitalis. However, in 1988, Alexander Kellner concluded that Pricesaurus was a nomen vanum, primarily because the specimens almost certainly represented different individuals. According to Kellner, the snout was from a larger animal than the middle part of the skull. In addition, the diagnosis did not contain true autapomorphies.

In 2012, a publication by Felipe Lima Pinheiro and colleagues presented the first detailed study of the specimens. It was concluded that the fossils indeed came from different individuals, even though their size was not necessarily incompatible. The snout showed that the fifth and sixth tooth pairs are smaller than the fourth and seventh, making the specimen indistinguishable between Anhanguera blittersdorffi and Anhanguera piscator, which show the same tooth pattern. Both specimens were referred to as Anhanguera sp. Pinheiro et al. also stated that Pricesaurus is a nomen nudum because it was named in an abstract.

== See also ==
- List of pterosaur genera
- Timeline of pterosaur research
