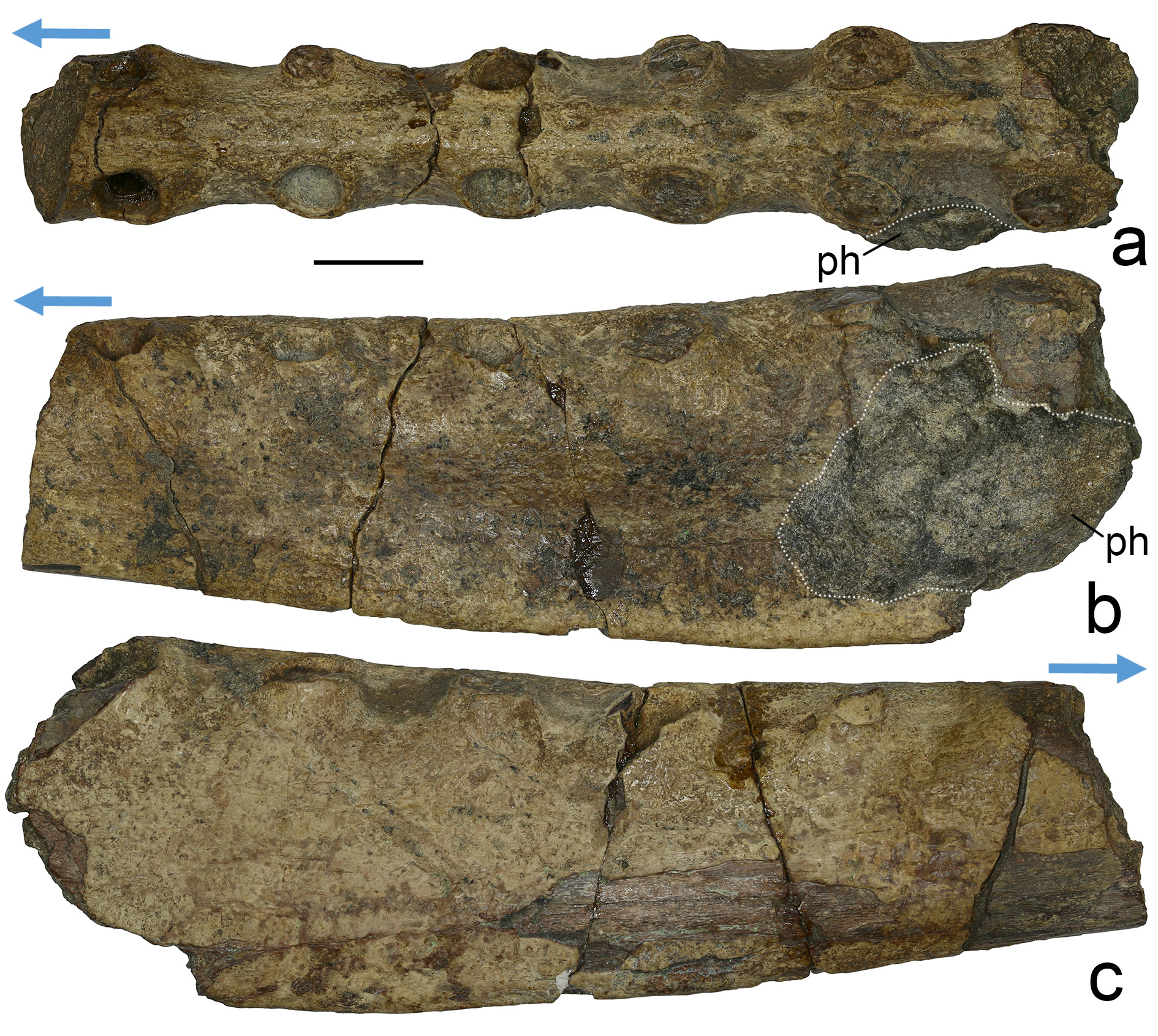
- Holotype specimen of Saratovia, a jaw fragment

Scientific classification
- Kingdom: Animalia
- Phylum: Chordata
- Class: Reptilia
- Order: †Pterosauria
- Suborder: †Pterodactyloidea
- Clade: †Targaryendraconia
- Genus: †Saratovia; Averianov, 2025

Type species
- †Saratovia glickmani Averianov, 2025

= Saratovia =

Saratovia Temporal range: Late Cretaceous, late Cenomanian

Genus of ornithocheiran pterosaurs

Saratovia is a genus of targaryendraconian pterosaurs that lived during the Late Cretaceous in what is now Russia. The genus contains a single species, S. glickmani, known from a partial lower jawbone, and is named after the city of Saratov, where the specimen was found, and its discover Leonid S. Glickman. The fossil comes from sedimentary rocks of the Melovatka Formation. Uncovered in the 1940s, the only specimen was assigned to various genera such as Ornithocheirus, Anhanguera and Coloborhynchus before being recognized as a new taxon and named in 2025. Likewise, though long thought to belong to the family Ornithocheiridae, more recent research lead to the erection of the distinct group Targaryendraconia, of which Saratovia is thought to be a member. As with other targaryendraconians, Saratovia would have possessed a narrow and elongate jaw tip filled with long teeth. It is distinguished from these relatives and other pterosaurs by the lack of a groove through the middle of its lower jaw, instead possessing a flattened platform covered in small foramina (holes) leading to an internal canal. Living in a shallow continental sea alongside marine reptiles and other pterosaurs, it likely had a piscivorous diet. As this ecosystem dates to the end of the Cenomanian age, Saratovia is considered one of the last toothed pterosaurs in the fossil record before their extinction.

== Discovery and naming ==
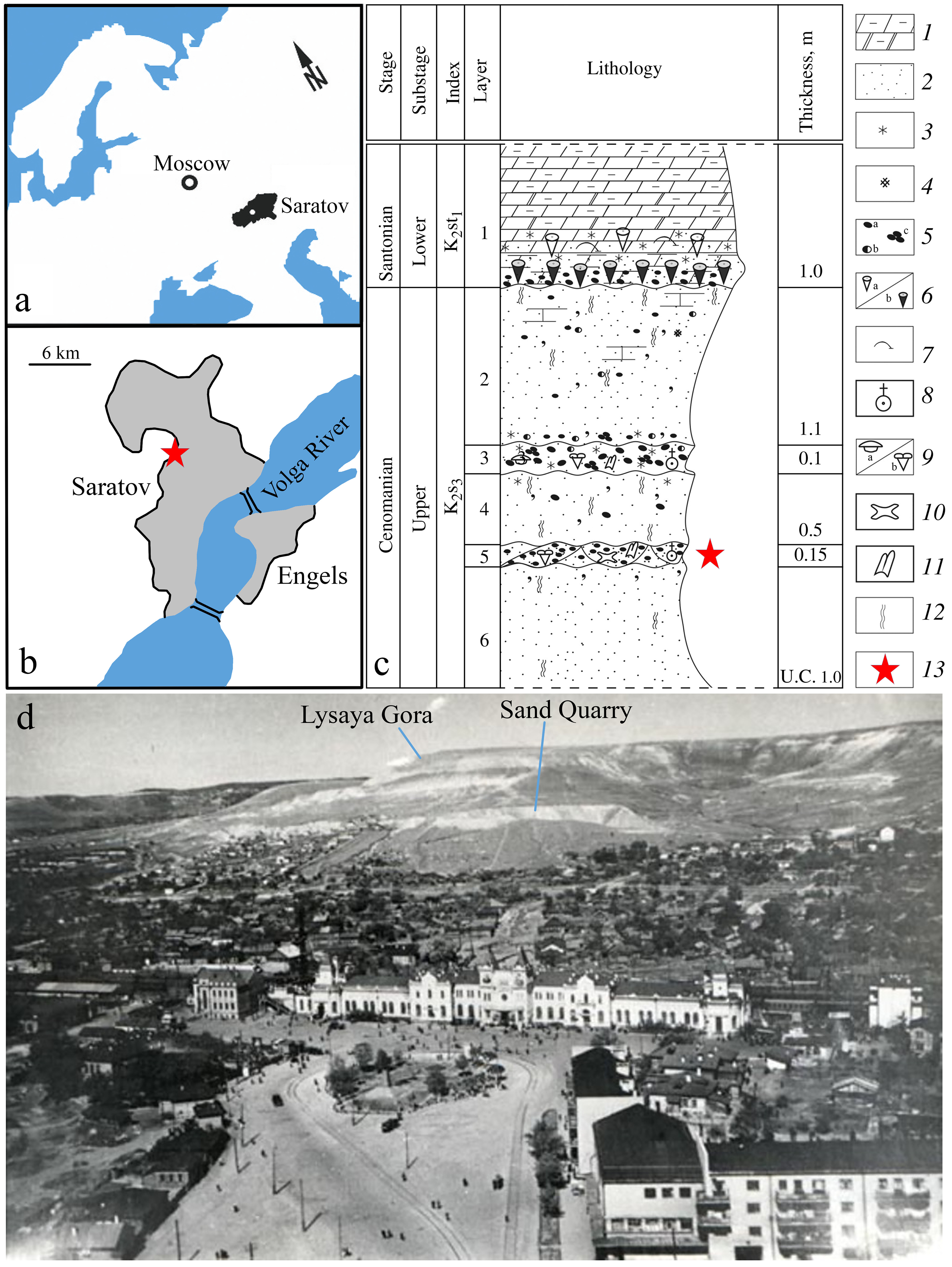
Type locality of Saratovia

In the later 1940s, Russian palaeontology student Leonid S. Glickman discovered a fragment of pterosaur rostrum in an abandoned sand quarry in Saratov, Saratov Oblast, Russia. The locality, termed the Lysaya Gora 3 locality, represents an outcrop of the upper Melovatka Formation, part of a series of Cenomanian-aged phosphorite sands widespread throughout European Russia. Pterosaur fossils of this age are considered to be rare in Europe outside of the Cambridge Greensand in England, and Glickman's specimen remains the only known Cenomanian pterosaur skull specimen from the country. It was later studied by Glickman's scientific supervisor, Lev I. Khozatsky. When first reporting it in a 1964 publication, he provisionally considered it to represent a specimen of the genus Ornithocheirus, which was a wastebasket taxon for the material of many unrelated pterosaurs at the time. He later drafted a more complete description, which was finalized and published by L. A. Nesov in 1995 after Khozatsky's death in 1992. This study identified the specimen as part of the upper jaw and noted that the unusual curvature suggested it represented a new taxon.

Subsequently, the specimen saw varying assignments to different pterosaurs. A study by Natalia N. Bakhurina and David M. Unwin, also published in 1995, considered the specimen "nearly identical" to Anhanguera cuvieri from England (later reclassified as Cimoliopterus), and so considered it possible that it represented that species. The same authors revisited the specimen in a 2000 study and compared it to Brazilian Anhanguera material. They tentatively classified it under that genus, though they did not assign it to any specific species. Alexander Averianov instead considered it to belong to the English genus Coloborhynchus in a 2007 study, and upheld this assignment in 2008. A 2013 review of the genus Ornithocheirus determined that it was distinct from both Ornithocheirus and the family Anhangueridae (including Anhanguera and Coloborhynchus) as a whole, and considered it likely to be a new taxon.

In 2025, Averianov redescribed the specimen as the new genus and species Saratovia glickmani. The generic name, Saratovia, refers to the city of Saratov where the holotype was found. The specific name, glickmani, honors L. S. Glickman, the discoverer of the specimen. The holotype specimen is held at the Zoological Institute of the Russian Academy of Science in Saint Petersburg, Russia, and is catalogued under the specimen number ZIN PHT-S50-1. It consists of part of the mandibular symphysis, the region near the tip of the snout where the two halves of the lower jaw fuse together; the tip of the bone is missing. Some uncertainty exists regarding the identification of the bone as a lower rather than upper jaw; traits such as a palatal ridge or median groove usually used to identify these elements are absent in the bone. Averianov concluded that it was a lower jaw due to its crest anatomy, which differs from that of the upper jaw of related taxa. Furthermore, the curvature of the bone is much more common in upturning lower jaws than in downturning upper ones in pterosaurs.

In 2026, Averianov and Denis I. Gubarev described a pterosaur neck vertebra from the Melovatka Formation with distinct anatomy from that of anhanguerid pterosaurs. Although the neck anatomy is unknown in the clade Targaryendraconia, the authors speculated that the specimen may belong to this group, possibly to Saratovia which is known from the same geologic horizon. However, this remains uncertain due to the lack of overlap with the Saratovia holotype, so the authors consider the specimen's identity uncertain.

== Description ==
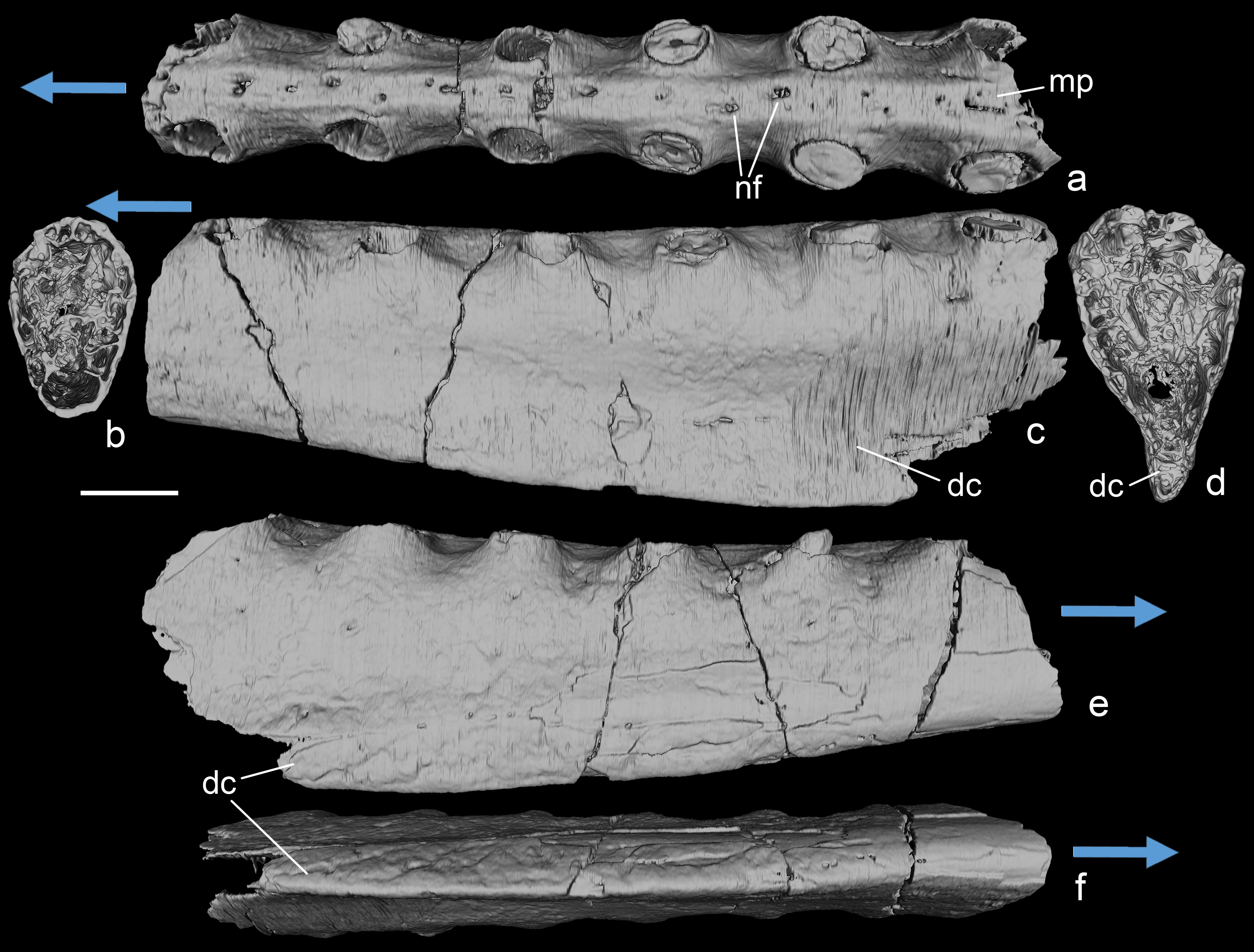
Surface scan of known jawbone

As a targaryendraconian pterosaur, Saratovia would have been a large flying animal with a distinctively narrow, elongate snout tip filled with teeth. Saratovia in particular is distinguished from all other pterosaurs by the anatomy of the floor of its mouth. Whereas other pterosaurs, including other members of Targaryendraconia, possess a clear groove along the middle of the lower jaw, Saratovia instead has a large, flat platform in this region, termed the median platform by Averianov. The surface of this platform is covered in holes called nutrient foramina, which in pterosaurs are usually small and few in number. In Saratovia, these foramina connect to an interior canal below the platform, also not observed in other pterosaurs. Both the platform and the internal canal run along the entire length of the preserved jaw. In addition to these features, the presence of a thin, hollow crest protruding from the bottom of the jaw is unique among targaryendraconians, which ordinarily have unornamented and strongly flattened lower jaws.

The preserved portion of the jaw is slightly upturned along its length, similar to that of the related Cimoliopterus, and tapers somewhat to be narrower at the front than the back. It is extremely narrow, only three and a half times the width of each tooth socket, and strongly scalloped such that the region between each socket is concave. Six tooth sockets with broken-off tooth crowns are preserved in the holotype, each pointing slightly outwards and forwards; the sockets are evenly spaced along the length of the jaw. Though the tips of the teeth are unknown, their bases are oval in cross section and are angled with respect to the jaw. They have very little variation in size and shape along the length of the jaw. As in other pterosaurs, the bones have thin walls and a honeycombed internal structure laced with air cavities.

== Classification ==
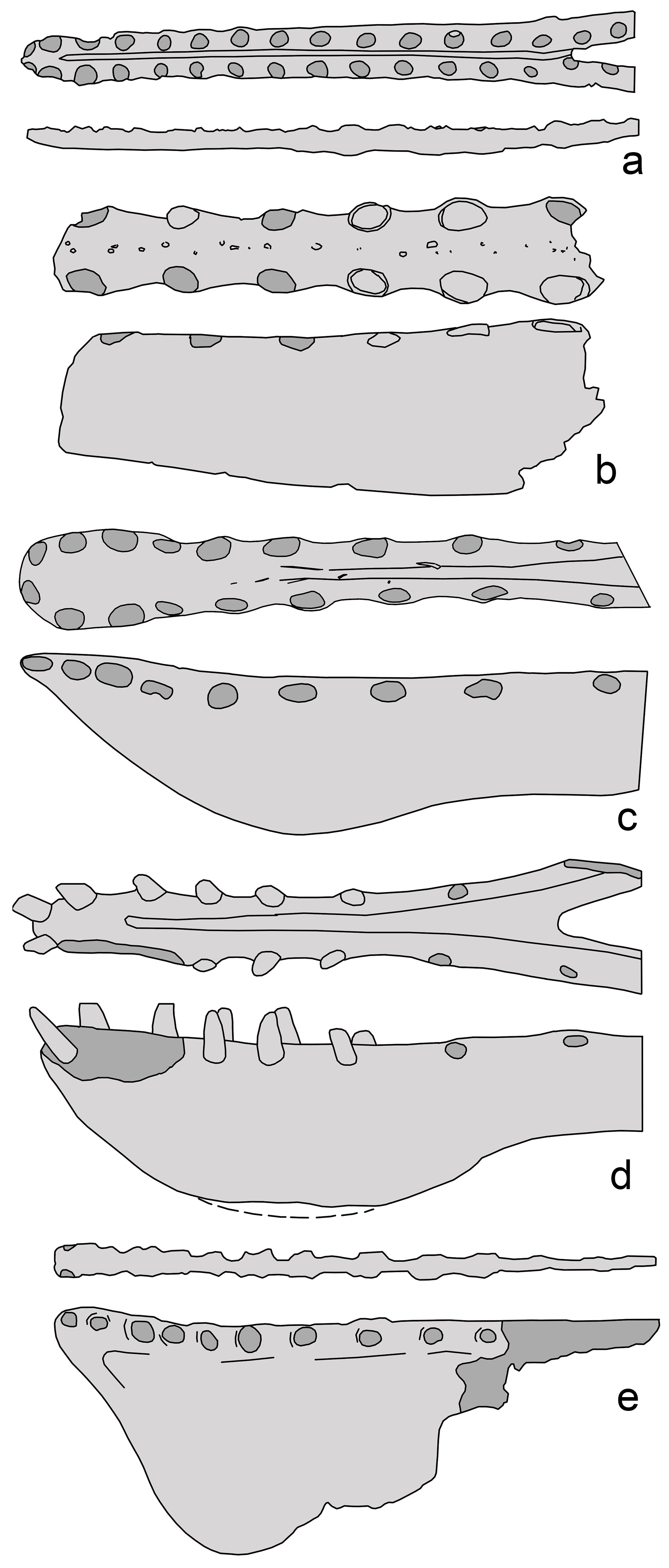
Jaw of Saratovia (B) compared to the related Aetodactylus (A) and anhanguerians (C–E); not to scale

Traditionally, the Saratov specimen was thought to be an ornithocheirid pterosaur. Many pterosaurs were formerly assigned to this family or its equivalent, the Anhangueridae, but more recent research has indicated more diversity within this lineage than previously recognized. In 2019, the pterosaurs Cimoliopterus, Targaryendraco, and their relatives were recognized as a novel group named Targaryendraconia. That study, by Rubi V. Pêgas, Borja Holgado, and Maria Eduarda C. Leal, noted that the Saratov pterosaur was similar in anatomy to recognized members of Targaryendraconia. However, the lack of the taxonomically informative snout tip prevented them from making a definite assignment.

This observation was formally tested by Averianov in the 2025 study naming Saratovia. Using a version of Pêgas' comprehensive pterosaur phylogenetic analysis from a 2024 study, he recovered Saratovia within Targaryendraconia. Its position relative to other members of the group was unresolved; a family known as Targaryendraconidae was recognized, but other members of the group including Saratovia and genera grouped in the 2019 study as Cimoliopteridae formed a polytomy, meaning that their exact relationships are unresolved. Averianov emphasized that the extremely fragmentary nature of targaryendraconian specimens—most are known only from snout or mandibular material—reduces the stability and resolution of the results. The resulting cladogram from the study is shown below:

- Ornithocheirae
  - Ornithocheirus
  - - Anhangueria
    - Targaryendraconia
      - Cimoliopterus cuvieri
      - Cimoliopterus dunni
      - Saratovia
      - - Aetodactylus
        - Camposipterus
      - Targaryendraconidae
        - Targaryendraco
        - - Barbosania
          - Aussiedraco

== Palaeoecology ==
The Cenomanian-aged phosphorite layers of Russia, where Saratovia is preserved in layers of the Melovatka Formation, preserve an ancient shallow epicontinental sea and many fossils. Invertebrates are represented by bivalves, gastropods, scaphopods, brachiopods, and occasional ammonites and belemnites. A rich assemblage of fish are known from the formation, including chondrichthyans such as sharks and chimaeroids as well as actinopterygian osteichthyans. Rarer are remains of tetrapods, which include elasmosaurid and polycotylid plesiosaurs, ichthyosaurs such as Platypterygius, mosasaurs, chelosphargine or chelonoid turtles, and an early form of bird similar to the later Ichthyornis. In addition to Saratovia itself, a species of lonchodectid pterosaur possibly referrable to Lonchodraco is known from the formation. The assemblage offers a window into marine ecosystems shortly before the Cenomanian-Turonian boundary event, a fourfold global surge in carbon dioxide levels that caused the extinction of many marine animals such as ichthyosaurs as well as all forms of toothed pterosaur. Saratovia, consequently, is one of the youngest toothed pterosaurs in the fossil record. Ornithocheiriformes, the larger clade containing Targaryendraconia, are thought to have been piscivorous animals, feeding primarily on fish in both freshwater and marine ecosystems.
