= List of pterosaur-bearing stratigraphic units =

This is a list of stratigraphic units, where pterosaur fossils have been recovered from. Units listed are all either formation rank or higher (e.g. group).

Name	Age	Location	Fossil species
Aguja Formation	Campanian	USA	
Alamyshik Formation	Albian	Kyrgyzstan	
Amminadav Formation or Bet-Meir Formation	Cenomanian	Palestine	
Antlers Formation	Aptian - Albian	USA	
Apón Formation	Aptian	Venezuela	
Argiles d'Ecqueville	Kimeridgian	France	
Argiles d'Octeville	Kimmeridgian	France	Normannognathus
Argilliti di Riva di Solto	Norian	Italy	Eudimorphodon
Artoles Formation	Barremian	Spain	
Austin Group	Coniacian	Mexico	Muzquizopteryx
Bahariya Formation	Cenomanian	Egypt	
?Bahia Series	Aptian	Brazil	
Bakhar Svita	Middle Jurassic	Mongolia	
Balabansai Svita	Callovian	Kyrgyzstan	
Bissekty Formation	Turonian	Uzbekistan	Azhdarcho
Blackhawk Formation	Campanian	USA	
Black Peaks Formation	Maastrichtian	USA	Quetzalcoatlus
Blesa Formation	Barremian	Spain	Iberodactylus
Blue Lias	Rhaetian - Sinemurian	UK	Dimorphodon
Bostobin Formation	Santonian - Campanian	Kazakhstan	Aralazhdarcho, Samrukia
Buda Limestone	Cenomanian	USA	
Budden Canyon Formation	Aptian	USA	
Calcaires tâchetés	Tithonian	France	Ctenochasma
Calcare di Aurisina	Campanian	Italy	
Calizas de La Huergina Formation	Barremian	Spain	
Calizas y Margas de Sierra Perenchiza Formation	Campanian - Maastrichtian	Spain	
Camadas de Guimarota	Kimmeridgian	Portugal	
Camarillas Formation	Barremian	Spain	
Cambridge Greensand	Albian	UK	Coloborhynchus
Cañadon Asfalto Formation	Callovian - Oxfordian	Argentina	
Candeleros Formation	Albian	Argentina	
Cerro del Pueblo Formation	Campanian	Mexico	
Chenini Formation	Albian	Tunisia	
Chico Formation	Campanian	USA	
?Chinle Formation	Carnian - Rhaetian	USA	
Chipping Norton Formation	Bathonian	UK	
Chulec Formation	Albian	Peru	
?Clarens Formation	Pliensbachian - Toarcian	South Africa	
Cornet Bauxite	Berriasian – Hauterivian	Romania	
Cotswold Slate	Bathonian	UK	
Crato Formation	Albian	Brazil	Arthurdactylus, Aymberedactylus, Ludodactylus, Tupandactylus
Csehbánya Formation	Santonian	Hungary	Bakonydraco
Curtis/Stump Formation	Callovian	USA	
Daohugou Beds	Middle - Late Jurassic	China	Jeholopterus, Pterorhynchus, Wukongopterus
Shaximiao Formation	Bathonian - Oxfordian	China	Angustinaripterus
Densus-Ciula Formation	Maastrichtian	Romania	Hatzegopteryx
Dinosaur Park Formation	Campanian	Canada	Cryodrakon, Navajodactylus
Dockum Group	Carnian - Rhaetian	USA	
Dolomia di Forni	Norian	Italy	Eudimorphodon, Preondactylus
Dunvegan Formation	Cenomanian	Canada	
Dzharakuduk Formation	Cenomanian	Uzbekistan	
Eagle Ford Formation	Turonian	USA	
Ejinhoro Formation	Early Cretaceous	China	
El Castillar Formation	Berriasian - Barremian	Spain	
El Gallo Formation	Maastrichtian	Mexico	
Elligserbrink Shale	Early Cretaceous	Germany	
Enciso Group	Aptian	Spain	
Erlhaz Formation	Aptian	Niger	
Eumeralla Formation	Albian	Australia	
Eutaw Formation	Coniacian - Santonian	USA	
Exu Formation	Late Cretaceous	Brazil	
Fleming Fjord Formation	Norian - Rhaetian	Greenland	Eudimorphodon
Forest Marble Formation	Bathonian	UK	
Gault Clay	Albian	UK	Lonchodectes
Gisement des Bessons	Tithonian	France	Cycnorhamphus
Glen Rose Formation	Aptian - Albian	USA	
Gosau Formation	Campanian	Austria	
Gramame Formation	Maastrichtian	Brazil	Nyctosaurus
"Great Oolite"	Bathonian	UK	
Greenhorn Limestone	Cenomanian	USA	
?Gres a Avicula contorta	Norian - Rhaetian	France	
Grès de la Crèche inférieurs	Tithonian	France	
Hakobuchi Group	Campanian	Japan	
?"Hallau Bonened"	Rhaetian	Switzerland	
Hampen Marly Formation	Bathonian	UK	
Hanson Formation	Early Jurassic	Ross Dependency	
Hasandong Formation	Hauterivian - Barremian	South Korea	
Hastings Beds	Berriasian – Valanginian	UK	Coloborhynchus, Lonchodectes
Hekou Formation	Early Cretaceous	China	
Hell Creek Formation	Maastrichtian	USA	
Himenoura Group	Santonian	Japan	
Huachihuanhe Formation	Late Jurassic	China	Huanhepterus
Hudspeth Formation	Albian	USA	Bennettazhia
Ilek Formation	?Hauterivian - Albian	Russia	
Intertrappean Beds	Maastrichtian	India	
Isalo III Formation	Bathonian	Madagascar	
Jagua Formation	Oxfordian	Cuba	Cacibupteryx, Nesodactylus
Javelina Formation	Maastrichtian	USA	Quetzalcoatlus
Jiufotang Formation	Aptian	China	Chaoyangopterus, Eoazhdarcho, Eopteranodon, Huaxiadraco, Jidapterus, Liaoningopterus, Liaoxipterus, Nemicolopterus, Nurhachius, Sinopterus
Karabastau Formation	Oxfordian - Kimmeridgian	Kazakhstan	Batrachognathus, Sordes
Kayenta Formation	Sinemurian - Pliensbachian	USA	Rhamphinion
Kem Kem Beds	Cenomanian	Morocco	Alanqa, Siroccopteryx
Khilok Formation	Aptian	Russia	
Khodzhakul Formation	Cenomanian	Uzbekistan	
Kimmeridge Clay	Late Jurassic	UK	Cuspicephalus
Kössen beds	Norian - Rhaetian	Switzerland	
Kota Formation	Hettangian - Pliensbachian	India	Campylognathoides
Kuwajima Formation	Valanginian	Japan	
La Amarga Formation	Hauterivian - Barremian	Argentina	
La Boca Formation	Middle Jurassic	Mexico	"Dimorphodon" weintraubi
La Cruz Formation	Aptian	Argentina	Pterodaustro
Lagarcito Formation	Albian	Argentina	Pterodaustro
Lance Formation	Maastrichtian	USA	
Lastres Formation	Kimmeridgian	Spain	
Lealt Shale	Bathonian	UK	Dearc
Lezas Formation	Aptian	Spain	Prejanopterus
Lianmuqin Formation	?Valanginian - Albian	China	Dsungaripterus, Lonchognathosaurus, Noripterus
"Lithographic Limestones"	Kimmeridgian	France	
Logbadjeck Formation	Campanian	Cameroon	
Lohan Cura Formation	Albian	Argentina	
Lower Chalk	Cenomanian	UK	
Lower Kimmeridgian Mudstones	Kimmeridgian	Germany	
Luohangdong Formation	?Valanginian - ?Albian	China	
Marne des Dives	Callovian	France	
Marnes Rouges de Roquelongue	Maastrichtian	France	
Marnes Rouges Inférieures Formation	Maastrichtian	France	
Marnes d'Auzas Formation	Maastrichtian	France	
Melovatka Formation	Cenomanian	Russia	
Meng-Yin Formation	Kimmeridgian or Tithonian	China	
Merchantville Formation	Campanian	USA	
Mesaverde Group	Campanian	USA	
Middle Chalk	Cenomanian - Turonian	UK	
Middle Iser Shales	Turonian	Czech Republic	
Mifune Group	Cenomanian - Turonian	Japan	
Miria Formation	Maastrichtian	Australia	
Mishash Formation	Campanian	Israel	
Mornsheimer Limestone	Tithonian	Germany	Altmuehlopterus, Germanodactylus, Pterodactylus, Ardeadactylus, Rhamphorhynchus
Mooreville Chalk	Santonian - Campanian	USA	
Morrison Formation	Oxfordian - Tithonian	USA	
Mowry Shale	Cenomanian	USA	
Mucuio Formation	Maastrichtian	Angola	Epapatelo
Murtoi Formation	Barremian - Aptian	Russia	
Nemegt Formation	Maastrichtian	Mongolia	
Niobrara Chalk	Coniacian - Campanian	USA	Dawndraco, Geosternbergia, Nyctosaurus, Pteranodon
North Horn Formation	Maastrichtian	USA	
Northumberland Formation	Campanian	Canada	
Nugget Sandstone	Late Triassic	United States	Caelestiventus
Nusplingen Limestone	Kimmeridgian	Germany	Cycnorhamphus, Ardeadactylus, Rhamphorhynchus
Okurodani Formation	Berriasian	Japan	
Oncala Formation	Berriasian	Spain	
Öösh Formation	Berriasian - Valanginian	Mongolia	
Oxford Clay Formation	Callovian - Oxfordian	UK	
Patuxent Formation	Aptian	USA	
Paw Paw Formation	Albian	USA	Coloborhynchus
Pierre Shale	Campanian	USA	Pteranodon
Plottier Formation	Coniacian - Santonian	Argentina	Thanatosdrakon
Portezuelo Formation	Turonian - Coniacian	Argentina	Argentinadraco
Posidonia Shale	Toarcian	Germany	Campylognathoides, Dorygnathus
Pudovinko Formation	Campanian	Russia	
"Purbeck"	Berriasian	Germany	Ctenochasma
Purbeck Beds	Tithonian - Berriasian	UK	Gnathosaurus, Plataleorhynchus
Qingshan Formation	Aptian - Albian	China	
Qiqu Formation	Oxfordian	China	
Quebrada del Barro Formation	Norian - Rhaetian	Argentina	Pachagnathus, Yelaphomte
Quebrada Monardes Formation	Early Cretaceous	Chile	Domeykodactylus
Reuchenette Formation	Kimmeridgian	Switzerland	
Río Belgrano Formation	Barremian	Argentina	
Rybushka Formation	Campanian	Russia	Bogolubovia, Volgadraco
Sannine Formation	Cenomanian	Lebanon	Microtuban
Sânpetru Formation	Maastrichtian	Romania	
Santa Ana Formation	Probably Early Cretaceous	Chile	
Santana Formation	Cenomanian	Brazil	Unwindia
?Santa Rosa Formation	Carnian	USA	
Sebeș Formation	Maastrichtian	Romania	Eurazhdarcho, Hatzegopteryx
Seefelder Beds	Norian	Austria	
Sekmenevka Formation	Aptian	Russia	
Sharp's Hill Formation	Bathonian	UK	
Shishugou Formation	Middle - Late Jurassic	China	
?Sloan Canyon Formation	Norian - Rhaetian	USA	
Snow Hill Island Formation		Argentine Antarctica; British Antarctic Territory; Chilean Antarctic Territory	
Solnhofen Plattenkalk	Kimmeridgian - Tithonian	Germany	Altmuehlopterus, Anurognathus, Aurorazhdarcho, Ctenochasma, Cycnorhamphus, Germanodactylus, Gnathosaurus, Pterodactylus, Ardeadactylus, Rhamphorhynchus, Scaphognathus
Solothurn Turtle Limestone	Kimmeridgian	Switzerland	
?Steinmergel Group	Norian - Rhaetian	Luxembourg	
Stonesfield Slate	Bathonian	UK	
Summerville Formation	Callovian - Oxfordian	USA	
Sundance Formation	Bathonian	USA	
?"Syren Bonebed"	Rhaetian	Luxembourg	
Tahora Formation	Campanian	New Zealand	
Tangshang Formation	Campanian	China	Zhejiangopterus
Tarrant Formation	Cenomanian	USA	Aetodactylus
Taynton Limestone Formation	Bathonian	UK	
Tendaguru Formation	Kimmeridgian - Tithonian	Tanzania	Tendaguripterus
Tiaojishan Formation	Bathonian - Oxfordian	China	Archaeoistiodactylus, Cascocauda, Changchengopterus, Darwinopterus, Fenghuangopterus, Jianchangopterus, Jianchangnathus, Kunpengopterus, Qinglongopterus, Sinomacrops
Tlayúa Formation	Albian	Mexico	
Toolebuc Formation	Albian	Australia	Aussiedraco, Mythunga, Thapunngaka
Torleite Formation	Kimmeridgian	Germany	Balaenognathus
Toxaster Limestone	Hauterivian	France	
Tsagaantsav Svita	Berriasian - Valanginian	Mongolia	Noripterus
Turners Falls Formation	Early Jurassic	USA	
Two Medicine Formation	Santonian - Campanian	USA	Montanazhdarcho
Uhangri Formation	Santonian - Campanian	South Korea	
"Unnamed unit of fissure fills"	Norian	UK	
"Unnamed unit of fissure fills"	Hettangian or Sinemurian	UK	
Upper Chalk	Cenomanian - Turonian	UK	
Upper 'couche III', phosphate deposits	Maastrichtian	Morocco	Phosphatodraco
Upper Elliot Formation	Pliensbachian - Toarcian	South Africa	
Upper Greensand	Albian	UK	Ornithocheirus
Upper Sables de Glos	Oxfordian	France	
Vaca Muerta Formation	Tithonian	Argentina	Herbstosaurus
Vectis Formation	Barremian	UK	Istiodactylus
"Wealden"	Barremian	UK	
Wessex Formation	Barremian	UK	Caulkicephalus
Whitby Mudstone Formation	Toarcian	UK	
White Chalk	Campanian	France	
White Chalk Formation	Coniacian	UK	
"Wierzbica Oolite and Platy Limestones"	Kimmeridgian	Poland	
Winton Formation	Cenomanian - Turonian	Australia	Ferrodraco
Yalovach Formation	Santonian	Tajikistan	
Yezo Group	Santonian - Campanian	Japan	
Yixian Formation	Barremian - Aptian	China	Beipiaopterus, Boreopterus, Cathayopterus, Dendrorhynchoides, Elanodactylus, Eosipterus, Feilongus, Gegepterus, Gladocephaloideus, Haopterus, Moganopterus, Ningchengopterus, Zhenyuanopterus
Zhirkindek Formation	Turonian - Coniacian	Kazakhstan	
Zorzino Limestone	Norian	Italy	Eudimorphodon, Peteinosaurus, ?Preondactylus
Züünbayan Formation	Aptian - Albian	Mongolia	

== See also ==
- Pterosaur
- List of fossil sites
