= Melovatka Formation =

Geologic formation in Russia

- Stratigraphic range: Middle Cenomanian; ~99–95 Ma
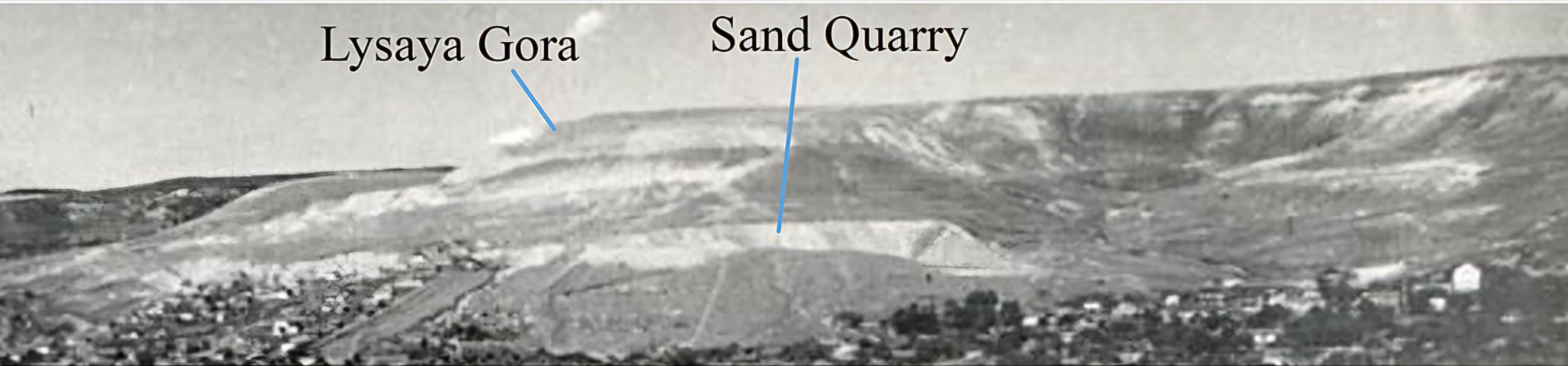
- The Melovatka Formation in 1941
- Type: Geological formation

Lithology
- Primary: Phosphorite
- Other: Sandstone

Location
- Coordinates: 50.9°N 44.7°E
- Approximate paleocoordinates: 43.1°N 38.8°E
- Region: Volgograd Oblast
- Country: Russia
- Extent: Saratov

Type section
- Named for: Melovatka
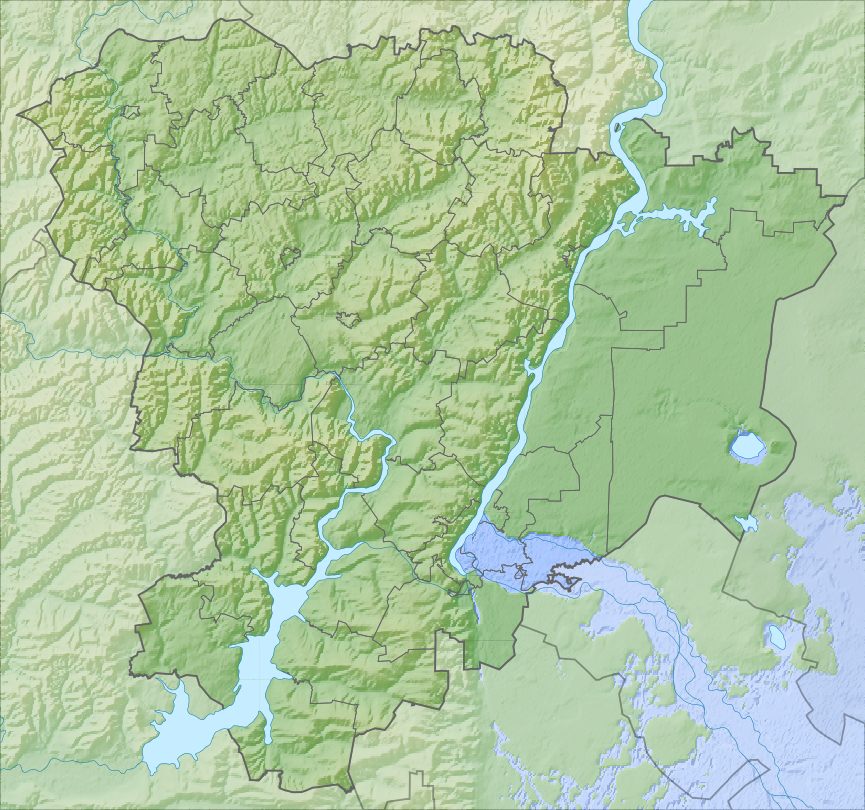
- Melovatka Formation (Russia) Melovatka Formation (Volgograd Oblast)

The Melovatka or Melovatsskaya Formation is a Cenomanian geologic formation in Russia. Pterosaur fossils have been recovered from the formation.

== Description ==
The two phosphorite horizons are separated in places by a yellowish sand interbed up to 1 m thick; however, they sometimes merge into a single horizon. The lower interbed or part of the integrated phosphorite horizon shows in places straight diagonal bedding, which is manifested in the orientation of almost flat pellets, pebbles, and pseudomorphs on bivalve shells. The phosphate concretions are irregular aggregates and rounded pebbles, ranging in size from several millimeters to 5–10 cm. They are dark brown or nearly black.

== Fossil content ==
The following vertebrate fossils were reported from the formation:

=== Fish ===
Color key: Taxon / Reclassified taxon / Taxon falsely reported as present / Dubious taxon or junior synonym / Ichnotaxon / Ootaxon / Morphotaxon	Notes; Uncertain or tentative taxa are in small text; ~~crossed out~~ taxa are discredited.

==== Chondrichthyes ====
===== Sharks =====
Sharks reported from the Melovatka Formation
Taxon	Species	Location	Stratigraphic position	Material	Notes	Images
Archaeolamna	A. cf. kopingensis					
Anomotodon	A. principalis					
Cretolamna	C. appendiculata					
Cretolamna	C. ex gr. borealis					
Cretoxyrhina	C. denticulata					
Cretoxyrhina	C. vraconensis					
Cantioscyllium	C. cf. decipiens					
Carcharias	C? sp.				Possible may be teeth of representatives of Odontaspididae	
Cretodus	C. sp.				The material found by Pervush's team in 1999 is considered erroneous by some sources.	
Dwardius	D. woodwardi					
Eostriatolamia	E. subulata					
Galeorhinus	G. glickmani					
Hybodontiformes	indeterminate					
Johnlongia	J. allocotodon					
"Megarhizodon"	"M. cf. macrorhiza"				At present, the genus Megarhizodon is a subjective synonym for Leptostyrax.	
Meristodonoides	M. sp.					
Paraorthacodus	P. recurvus					
"Pseudoisurus"	"P. denticulatus"				Possible relative of Dwardius	
Pseudomegachasma	P. casei					
Pseudoscapanorhynchus	P. cf. compressidens					
Protolamna	P. sokolovi					
Ptychodus	P. decurrens					
Ptychodus	P. mammillaris					
Polyacrodus	P. sp.					
Scapanorhynchus	S. raphiodon					
Scapanorhynchus	S. minimus					
Squalicorax	S. falcatus					
Squalicorax	S. curvatus					
Squatina	S. sp.					
Synechodus	S. dispar					
Odontaspis	O. sp.					
Orectoloboides	O. parvulus					
Palaeoanacorax	P. obliquus					
Palaeoanacorax	P. volgensis			Not considered a valid taxon by some scientists		

===== Other cartilaginous fish =====
Other cartilaginous fish reported from the Melovatka Formation
Taxon	Species	Location	Stratigraphic position	Material	Notes	Images
Chimaeridae	Indeterminate					
Elasmodectes	E. kiprijanoffi					
Edaphodon	E. sedgwicki					
Elasmodus	E. sinzovi					
Ischyodus	I. latus					

==== Bony fish ====
Osteichthyans reported from the Melovatka Formation
Taxon	Species	Location	Stratigraphic position	Material	Notes	Images
Enchodontidae	Indeterminate					
Osteichthyes	indeterminate					

=== Dinosaurs ===
Dinosaurs reported from the Melovatka Formation
Taxon	Species	Location	Stratigraphic position	Material	Notes	Images
Cerebavis	C. cenomanica				An ornithuran	
Ichthyornithidae	Indeterminate					

=== Pterosaurs ===
Pterosaurs reported from the Melovatka Formation
Taxon	Species	Location	Stratigraphic position	Material	Notes	Images
Lonchodectes	L. sp.					
Saratovia	S. glickmani					
Ornithocheiroidea	Indeterminate					
Targaryendraconia	indet.					

=== Plesiosaurs ===
Plesiosaurs reported from the Melovatka Formation
Taxon	Species	Location	Stratigraphic position	Material	Notes	Images
Elasmosauridae	indeterminate					
Plesiosauria	indeterminate					
Pliosauridae	indeterminate					

=== Icthyosaurs ===
Icthyosaurs reported from the Melovatka Formation
Taxon	Species	Location	Stratigraphic position	Material	Notes	Images
Pervushovisaurus	P. campylodon			A partial skull	A platypterygiine ichthyosaur, previously named Platypterygius kiprianoffi	
Platypterygius	?P. sp.					

=== Turtles ===
Turtles reported from the Melovatka Formation
Taxon	Species	Location	Stratigraphic position	Material	Notes	Images
Chelonioidea	indeterminate					

== See also ==
- List of pterosaur-bearing stratigraphic units
- List of fossiliferous stratigraphic units in Russia
  - Sekmenevsk Formation
