= Alamyshik Formation =

Geological formation in Kyrgyzstan

- Stratigraphic range: Albian; ~112–100 Ma
- Type: Geological formation

Lithology
- Primary: Claystone

Location
- Coordinates: 40.0°N 73.0°E
- Approximate paleocoordinates: 37.4°N 68.2°E
- Region: Osh
- Country: Kyrgyzstan
- Extent: Fergana Valley
- Alamyshik Formation (Kyrgyzstan)

The Alamyshik Formation is a geological formation in Kyrgyzstan whose strata date back to the Albian stage of the Early Cretaceous. Pterosaur remains are among the fossils that have been recovered from the formation.

== Fossil content ==
Reptiles

- Ferganemys verzilini
- Kirgizemys exaratus
- Petrochelys kyrgyzensis
- Crocodylia indet.
- Pterosauria indet.
- ?Labyrinthodontia indet.

Fish

- cf. Furo sp.
- Actinopterygii indet.

== See also ==
- List of pterosaur-bearing stratigraphic units
