= Khilok Formation =

Geologic formation in Russia

- Stratigraphic range: Aptian; ~120–113 Ma
- Type: Geological formation
- Thickness: 900–1,400 m (3,000–4,600 ft)

Lithology
- Primary: Trachybasalt
- Other: Conglomerate, sandstone

Location
- Coordinates: 50.7°N 107.9°E
- Approximate paleocoordinates: 52.7°N 105.6°E
- Region: Buryatia
- Country: Russia
- Khilok Formation (Russia)

The Khilok Formation is an Early Cretaceous geologic formation in Buryatia, Russia. While the lower portion of the formation consists of sandstone and conglomerates, the upper portion of the formation largely consists of trachybasalt, these deposits have been dated to the Aptian. A thin 20 cm bed is known from the formation containing the remains of numerous indeterminate vertebrates, including dinosaur and pterosaurs and an indeterminate species of Kirgizemys.

== Fossil content ==
The following fossils were reported from the formation:

Reptiles

- Kirgizemys sp.
- Prodeinodon sp.
- Choristodera indet.
- Dromaeosauridae indet.
- Hypsilophodontidae indet.
- Ornithopoda indet.
- Ornithocheiridae indet.
- Scincomorpha indet.
- Testudines indet.
- Titanosauriformes indet.

Amphibians

- Discoglossidae indet.

Fish

- Hybodus sp.
- Amiiformes indet.
- Palaeonisciformes indet.
- Teleostei indet.

== See also ==
- List of pterosaur-bearing stratigraphic units
- Murtoi Formation
