= Lezas Formation =

Geological Formation in Spain

- Type: Geological formation

Location
- Country: Spain

The Leza or Lezas Formation is a Mesozoic geologic formation in Spain. The sedimentary deposits include both carbonate and clastic sediments, interpreted to have been deposited in a coastal wetland environment. Pterosaur fossils have been recovered from the formation.

== See also ==
- List of pterosaur-bearing stratigraphic units
