= Nutrient canal =

Openings in the bone

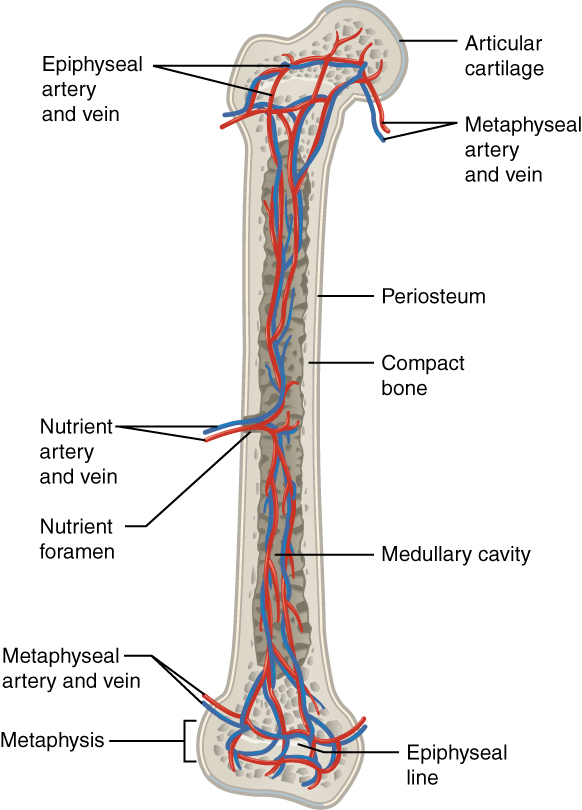
- The blood supply to long bones, here with nutrient artery, vein and foramen labeled.

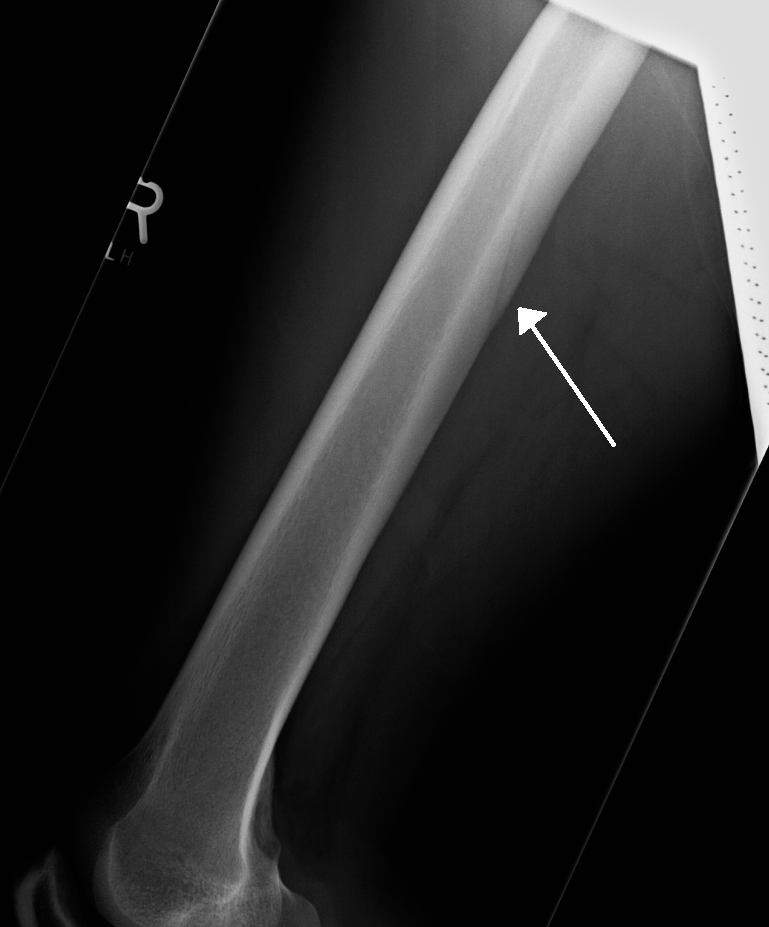
- A nutrient canal feeding the femur seen on X-ray

Identifiers
- TA98: A02.0.00.042
- TA2: 402
- FMA: 75378

All bones possess larger or smaller foramina (openings) for the entrance of blood-vessels; these are known as the nutrient foramina, and are particularly large in the shafts of the larger long bones, where they lead into a nutrient canal, which extends into the medullary cavity. The nutrient canal (foramen) is directed away from the growing end of bone. The growing ends of bones in upper limb are upper end of humerus and lower ends of radius and ulna. In lower limb, the lower end of femur and upper end of tibia are the growing ends. The nutrient arteries along with nutrient veins pass through this canal. A nutrient canal is found in long bones, in the mandible, and in dental alveoli. In long bones the nutrient canal is found in the shaft.
