= Chulec Formation =

Geological formation in Peru

- Stratigraphic range: Albian
- Type: Geological formation
- Underlies: Pariatambo Formation
- Overlies: Inca Formation
- Thickness: 100–200 m (330–660 ft)

Lithology
- Primary: Limestone
- Other: Marl, shale, sandstone

Location
- Coordinates: 9.9°S 77.0°W
- Approximate paleocoordinates: 15.4°S 49.0°W
- Region: Cajamarca & Huánuco Regions
- Country: Peru

Type section
- Named for: Chulec, Yauli Province
- Chulec Formation (Peru)

The Chulec Formation (Ki-chu) is a geological formation in Peru whose strata date back to the Albian. The formation has a thickness of about 100 to 200 metres (330 to 660 ft) and comprises limestones, marls and calcareous sandstones that were deposited during a marine transgression from the west. Pterosaur remains and ammonites are among the fossils that have been recovered from the formation.

== See also ==
- List of pterosaur-bearing stratigraphic units
