= Pudovinko Formation =

Late Cretaceous geologic formation in Russia

Pudovkino Formation
- Stratigraphic range: Campanian; ~83–71 Ma
- Type: Geological formation

Lithology
- Primary: Marl

Location
- Coordinates: 51.5°N 46.0°E
- Approximate paleocoordinates: 42.8°N 40.8°E
- Region: Saratov Oblast
- Country: Russia
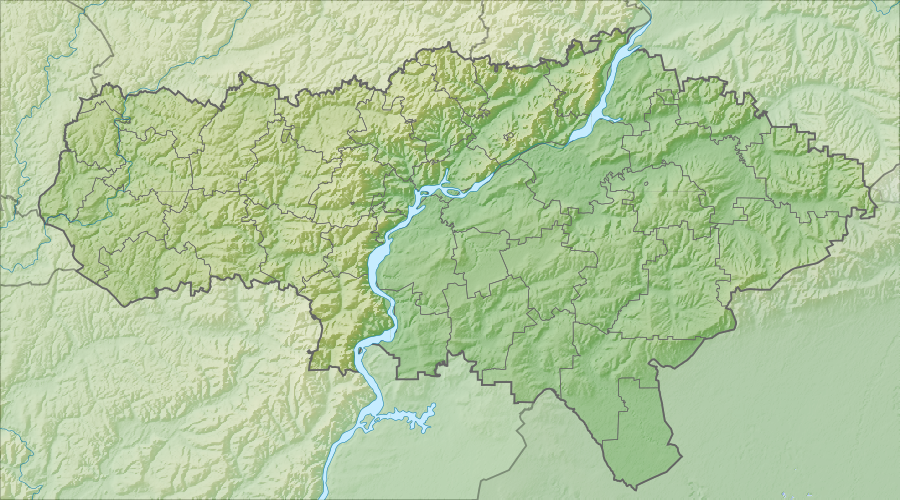
- Pudovinko Formation (Russia) Pudovinko Formation (Saratov Oblast)

The Pudovkino Formation (Russian: Pudovkino Svita) is a Late Cretaceous (Campanian) geologic formation in Saratov Oblast of European Russia. Pterosaur fossils have been recovered from the marine marls of the formation.

== Fossil content ==
The following fossils have been reported from the formation:

- Pterosaurs
  - Azhdarchidae indet.
- Bivalves
  - Monticulina vesicularis
- Belemnites
  - Belemnitella mucronata
  - Kosmospirella cf. similis
- Echinoids
  - Echinocorys sp.

== See also ==
- List of pterosaur-bearing stratigraphic units
