= Sekmenevsk Formation =

Cretaceous geologic formation in Russia

- Stratigraphic range: Albian-Cenomanian; ~113–94 Ma
- Type: Geological formation

Lithology
- Primary: Sandstone
- Other: Phosphate

Location
- Coordinates: 51.9°N 36.2°E
- Approximate paleocoordinates: 42.9°N 32.7°E
- Region: Kursk Oblast
- Country: Russia
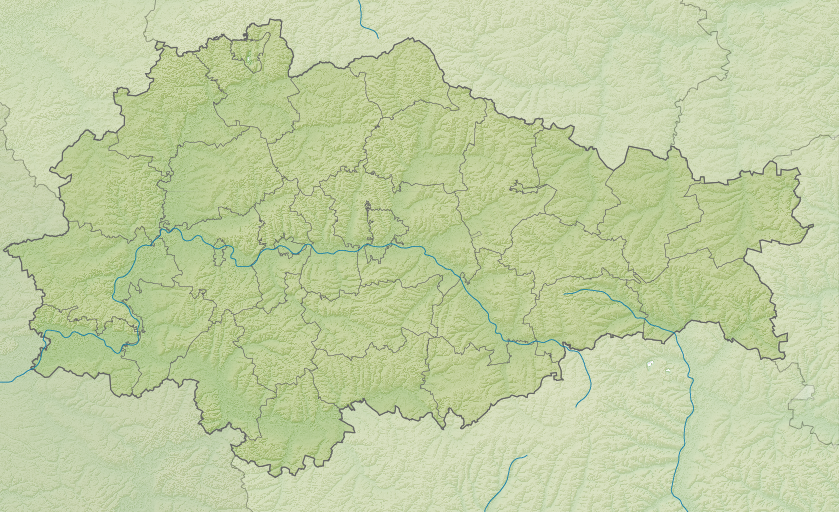
- Sekmenevsk Formation (Russia) Sekmenevsk Formation (Kursk Oblast)

The Sekmenevsk Formation (Russian: Sekmenevska Svita) is a Cretaceous (Albian to Cenomanian) geologic formation in the Kursk Oblast of European Russia. Pterosaur fossils have been recovered from the formation.

== Fossil content ==
The following fossils have been reported from the formation:

- Poekilopleuron schmidti
- Reptilia indet.

== See also ==
- List of pterosaur-bearing stratigraphic units
- List of fossiliferous stratigraphic units in Russia
  - Melovatka Formation
