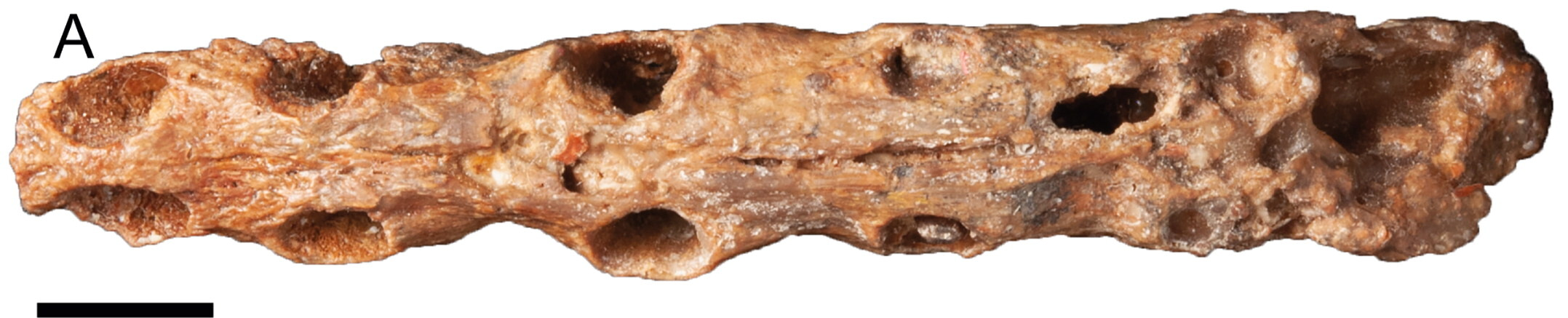

- Holotype mandible in top down (top) and oblique views

Scientific classification
- Kingdom: Animalia
- Phylum: Chordata
- Class: Reptilia
- Order: †Pterosauria
- Suborder: †Pterodactyloidea
- Clade: †Ornithocheiriformes
- Clade: †Ornithocheirae
- Clade: †Targaryendraconia
- Family: †Targaryendraconidae
- Genus: †Aussiedraco; Kellner, Rodrigues & Costa, 2011

Type species
- †Aussiedraco molnari Kellner, Rodrigues & Costa, 2011

= Aussiedraco =

Aussiedraco Temporal range: Early Cretaceous, 105–104 Ma

Genus of pterosaur from the Early Cretaceous

Aussiedraco (meaning "Australian dragon") is a genus of pterosaur, an order of flying reptiles commonly known as "pterodactyls", that lived during the Early Cretaceous in what is now Australia. The genus belongs to the family Targaryendraconidae, a group of toothed pterodactyloids. It is known from a single dentary (lower jawbone) fragment that was unearthed in a limestone outcrop of the Albian-aged Toolebuc Formation. This dentary was first discovered in the 1970s in a site in western Queensland, the first pterosaur found on the continent. It was initially described in 1980 by Australian paleontologists Ralph E. Molnar and Richard A. Thulborn as belonging to Ornithocheirus. Until it was recognized as coming from its own genus and species, this dentary was assigned to Ornithocheirus, Anhanguera, and Lonchodectes. In 2011, Brazilian paleontologists Alexander Kellner, Taissa Rodrigues, and Fabiana R. Costa scientifically described it as Aussiedraco molnari.

Aussiedraco was classified as an ornithocheirid and as an indeterminate pteranodontoid until 2019, when Brazilian paleontologist Rubi Pêgas and colleagues moved it to Targaryendraconidae. The dentary of Aussiedraco is very unique. It lacks any crests, bears a convex surface, and has a flat bottom surface. Based on the anatomy of its alveoli (tooth sockets) the bottom and top teeth could interlock. Aussiedraco lived alongside the other pterosaurs Mythunga, Ferrodraco, and Haliskia in the Toolebuc Formation. During the Albian the Toolebuc Formation was a near-land open ocean that had low oxygenated waters. It preserves a diverse array of plesiosaur, ichthyosaur, turtle, dinosaur, fish, shark, and invertebrate fossils.

== Discovery and classification ==
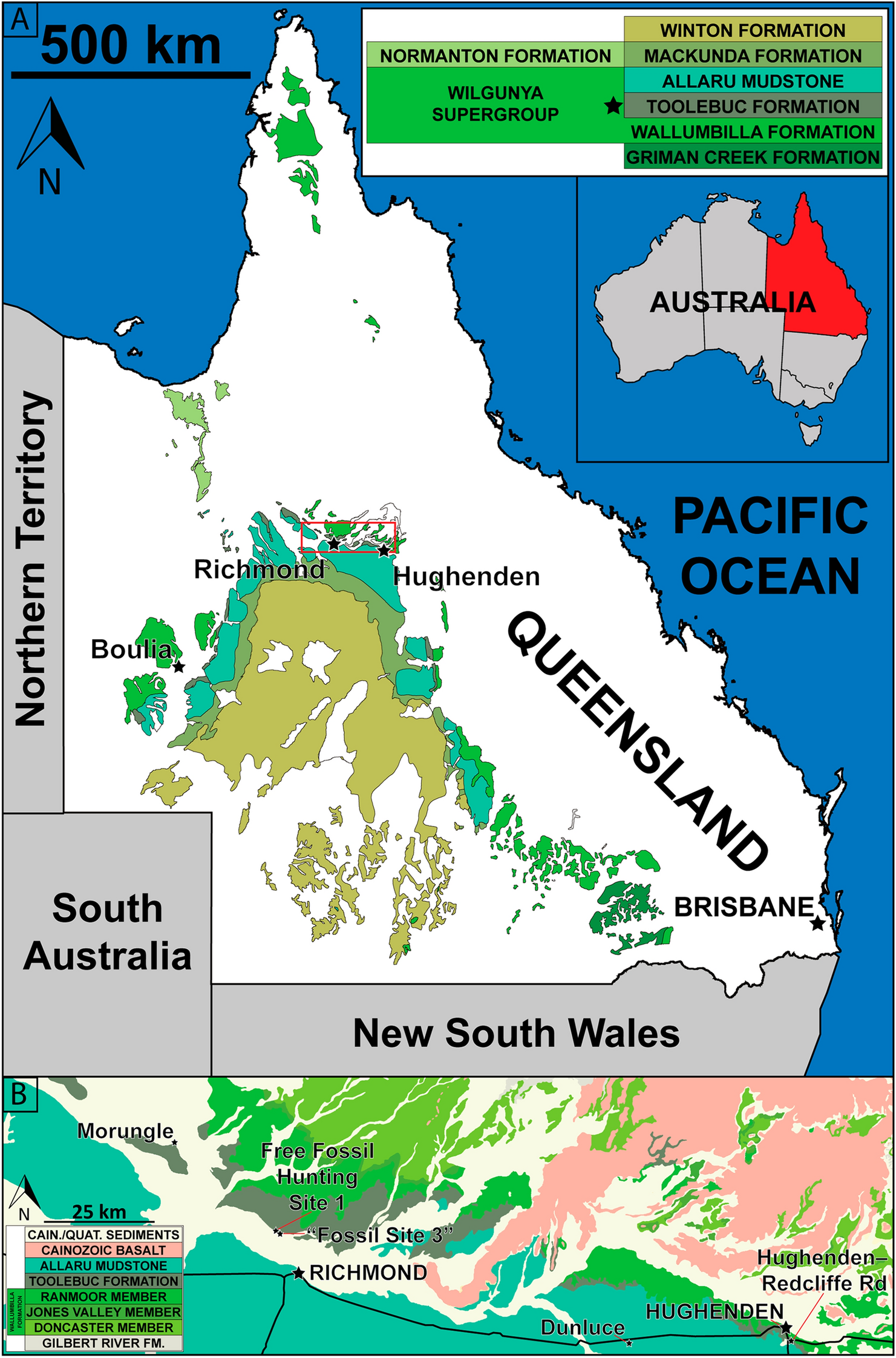
Geologic map of Queensland, showing Bouila and outcrops of the Toolebuc Formation where QM F10613 was found

Prior to 1980, no pterosaur material had been reported form Australia in scientific literature. Fossils of Aussiedraco were first unearthed in the 1970s from a flaggy limestone outcrop of the Toolebuc Formation around 70 kilometres (43 mi) east of Bouila and 13 kilometres (8.1 mi) south of the Hamilton Hotel in western Queensland, Australia. The Toolebuc Formation, a part of the larger Eromanga Basin, is composed of crystalline limestones dotted with concretions, as well as minor shale bands. This formation derives from the upper Albian stage of the Lower Cretaceous period, which dates to about 105-104 million years ago. The remains known of Aussiedraco consist of a single, incomplete mandibular symphysis (the area of the lower jaw where the left and right mandibles meet), which is cataloged at the Queensland Museum under specimen number QM F10613. This specimen was discovered in the same block as a pterosaur vertebra. QM F10613 was the first pterosaur cranial material found in Australia.

In 1980, Australian paleontologists Ralph E. Molnar and Richard A. Thulborn described QM F10613 in an article in the journal Nature. They assigned QM F10613 to Ornithocheiridae indet. aff. (sharing affinties with) Ornithocheirus at a time when Ornithocheirus was a wastebasket taxon for Cretaceous toothed pterodactyloid fossils. In 2000, German researcher David Unwin and colleagues reassigned QM F10613 to the anhanguerid Anhanguera? cuvieri, which is now in the genus Cimoliopterus. In contrast, Molnar and Thunborn (2007) opted to refer the specimen to the lonchodectid Lonchodectes. In 2010, American researcher Timothy Myers followed Molnar and Thunborn (1980) by assigning the dentary to aff. Ornithocherius. The constant reassignment of QM F10613 was rooted in its fragmentary nature and the wider taxonomic issues plaguing Cambridge Greensand pterosaur genera, such as Ornithocheirus and Lonchodectes.

In 2011, Brazilian paleontologists Alexander Kellner, Taissa Rodrigues, and Fabiana R. Costa scientifically described QM F10613 and identified it as belonging to a new genus and species of pternodontoid pterosaur, Aussiedraco molnari. The generic name Aussiedraco derives from Aussie, a shortened name for Australia, and the Latin word draco "dragon". The specific name is in honor of Molnar, who contributed significantly to the field of Australian vertebrate paleontology. QM F10613 was selected as the holotype (name-bearing) specimen and remains the only material assigned to the species. Aussiedraco remains the only confirmed non-anhanguerian pterosaur discovered from Australia.

=== Classification ===
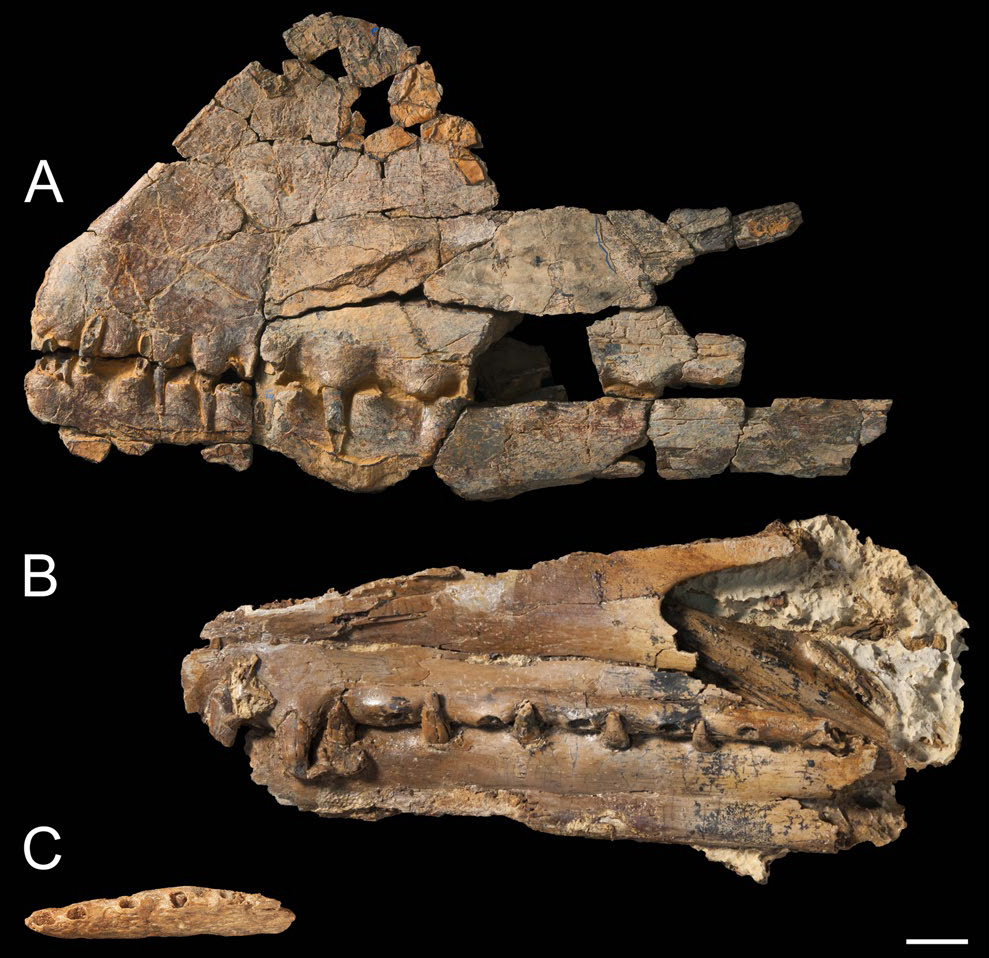
Snout fossils of Ferrodraco, Mythunga, and Aussiedraco (bottom left) compared

Prior to the description of Aussiedraco, QM F10613 was ascribed to Ornithocheirus, Anhanguera, Lonchodectes, and as an indeterminate ornithocheirid. In their description, Kellner and colleagues assigned Aussiedraco to the Pteranodontoidea, a clade roughly containing the same species as the Ornithocheiroidea sensu Unwin. They further stated that it would be more closely allied with Anhangueridae, but would not itself be a member. In 2019, Brazilian paleontologist Rubi Pêgas and colleagues published a study in which they recognized a new cosmopolitan group of toothed pterodactyloids, which they termed Targaryendraconia. Targaryendraconians are distinguished from other pterosaurs by the presence of a thin dentary tip, jaws widest at the third pair of alveoli (tooth sockets), teeth on over 70% of the total jaw length, a bony bar bifurcating (dividing) the first pair of alveoli, a deep, narrow groove running down the middle of the lower jaw, and raised sides at the end of the dentary that run almost parallel. Outside of Targaryendraconia, the group is part of the larger clade Ornithocheiromorpha, which includes a multitude of toothed pterodactyloid families such as Anhangueridae, Istiodactylidae, and Hamipteridae.

Targaryendraconians have been reported from sites in Germany, Brazil, England, Australia, and the United States, with a range dating from the Hauterivian to the Cenomanian stages of the Cretaceous period. This clade includes two families: Cimoliopteridae, which includes genera like Cimoliopterus and Aetodactylus, and Targaryendraconidae, which includes Aussiedraco itself, Targaryendraco, and Barbosania. Targaryendraconids are primarily known from fragmentary rostral or mandibular remains. The genus Saratovia may also a targaryendraconid as well, but this has not been confirmed. In their phylogenetic analysis, Pêgas and colleagues (2019) recovered Aussiedraco, Barbosania, and Targaryendraco as sister taxa. This result has been replicated by other phylogenetic analyses. Below is a cladogram following Pêgas et al. (2019). In this analysis, they recovered Aussiedraco within the family Targaryendraconidae within the larger clade Targaryendraconia.

- Ornithocheirae
  - Ornithocheirus
  - - Targaryendraconia
      - Targaryendraconidae
        - Aussiedraco
        - Barbosania
        - Targaryendraco
      - Cimoliopteridae
        - Aetodactylus
        - Camposipterus
        - Cimoliopterus
    - Anhangueria
      - Hamipteridae
        - Hamipterus
        - Iberodactylus
      - Anhangueridae
        - Tropeognathus
        - Coloborhynchinae
        - Anhanguerinae

== Description ==
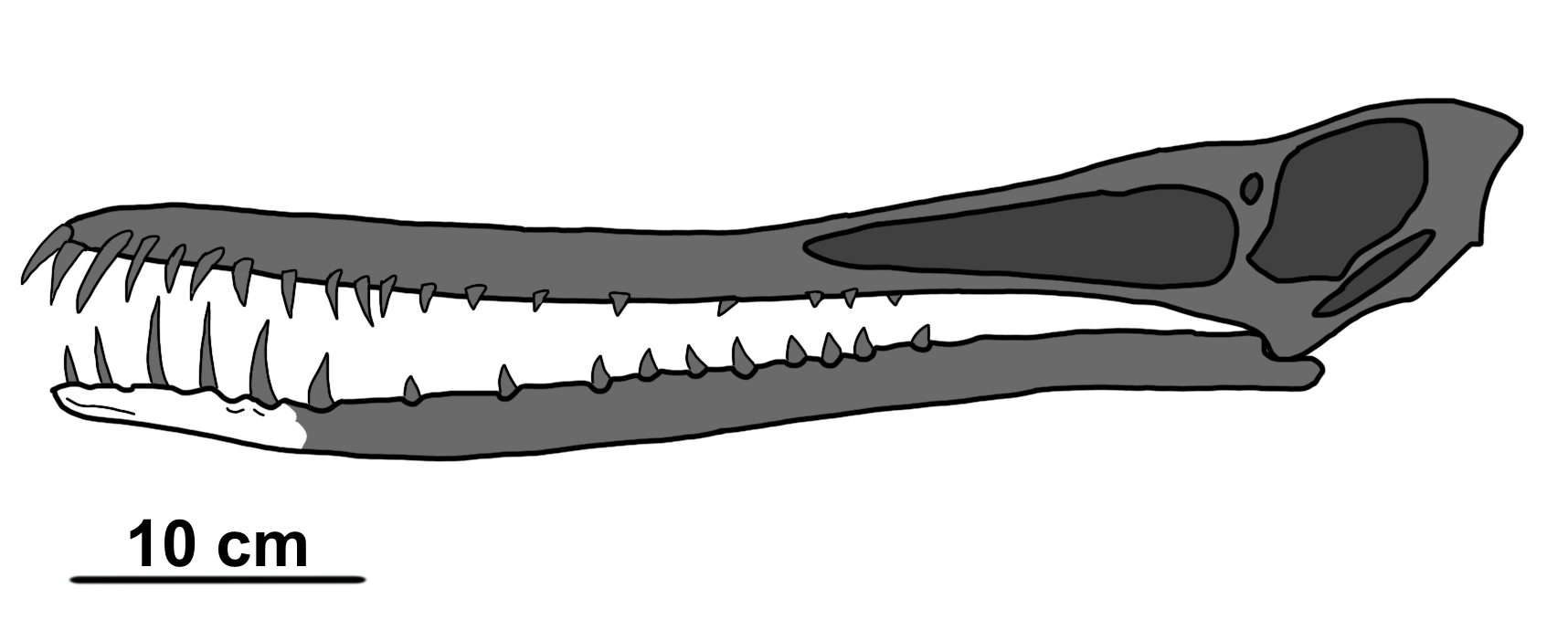
Skull reconstruction with known elements in white and unknown in grey (based on Barbosania)

In 2019, Pêgas and colleagues abstained from giving an Aussiedraco wingspan estimate, but they estimated the wingspan of the closely related Barbosania at 2.9 to 4 meters (9.5 to 13.1 ft). Many isolated pterosaur postcranial remains have been found from the Toolebuc Formation as well, such as a scapulocoracoid (shoulder girdle), vertebrae (backbones), and wing remains. These could belong to Aussiedraco, but the lack of overlap means this is impossible to confirm until more material is known.

The holotype consists of a three-dimensionally preserved fragment measuring about 88 millimetres (3.5 in) in length. Internally it is lightly built with a thin bone cortex, as in other pterosaurs. As far as can be judged from the empty elliptical alveoli, the lower jaws carry at least five pairs of teeth, which are rather large and become more outwards inclining and procumbent towards the front. Based on the scalloping of the alveoli, the upper and lower teeth were likely able to interlock, especially at the front margin of the symphysis. The first through fourth alveoli are placed more higher up than the others, causing them to project outwards. It is distinguished from all other pterosaurs by the presence of a convex top mandibular margin and a flat bottom margin. These two traits are autapomorphies (characteristics not found in other species). It has a unique combination of synapomorphies (traits shared with other species) too such as a symphysis that is deeper than wide. Unlike anhanguerids, ornithocheirids, and lonchodectids, the mandible lacks a crest or any kind of bony expansion.

The occlusal (inside) surface of the mandible was relatively curved, unlike the straight jaw of the contemporaneous Haliskia. Compared to Ferrodraco, Aussiedraco's mandible is less distally expanded and less robust, with a relatively straighter left lateral surface. In contrast to Ferrodraco, the anterior margin of the mandibular groove is markedly prominent and appears pronounced from the posterior boundary of the third alveolus until the posterior end of the fourth alveolus. Furthermore, Aussiedraco is distinguished from both Ferrodraco and Mythunga by its lack of raised alveolar borders (ridges around the alveoli). The frontmost two pairs of alveoli are larger than those of Ferrodraco, indicating that the front teeth of Aussiedraco were larger than Ferrodraco's. However, this might also be an artifact of erosion.

The most notable difference between the two genera is that Aussiedraco bears two sucli (folds) on its rostral mandibular tip. This characteristic is absent in all other pterosaurs, but may have been caused by over preparation of the fossils with acetic acid or may represent a split mandibular groove. The only other pterosaur this is known from is Cearadactylus, a synonym of Brasileodactylus, suggesting that they may be synonyms (the same taxon). However, this is unlikely as this trait has not been confirmed and the two come from different terminals, continents, and families.

== Paleoecology ==
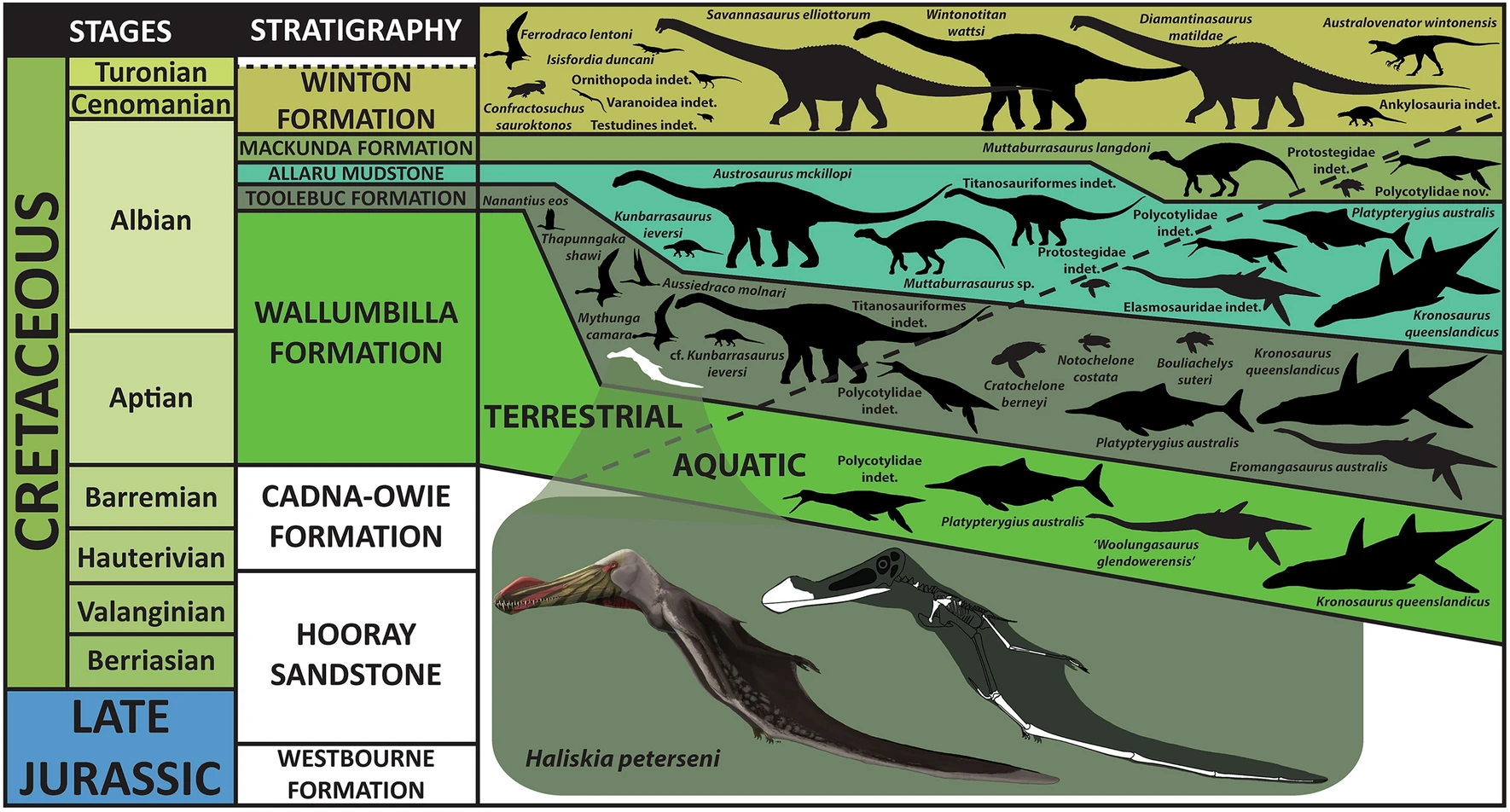
Diagram showing the fauna of the Toolebuc Formation and other units of the Eromanga Basin

=== Diet and feeding ===
The ecology and diet of ornithocheiromorphs like Aussiedraco has been debated. Although, no studies directly analyzing the diet or ecology of targaryendraconids have been published. Historically, most ornithocheiromorphs were regarded as purely piscivorous, with a diet made up of small and medium fish. However, some genera like Istiodactylus possibly fed on terrestrial fauna and carrion, while Coloborhynchus consumed terrestrial vertebrates and invertebrates. In a 2006 study, Dutch paleontologist André J. Veldmeijer and colleagues stated ornithocheiromorphs likely had piscivorous diets due to their prevalence in aquatic habitats, interlocking teeth, and anteriorly-placed eyes.

Furthermore, Veldmeijer and colleagues hypothesized that the small bodies and large heads of ornithocheiromorphs suggest that they may have lacked a capacity for giant fish. Instead, they potentially hunted small fish or pre-digested them prior to swallowing, as their teeth lacked adaptations for chewing. In 2012, British paleontologist Mark Witton pointed out that the protruded, sharp teeth at the anterior tips of ornithocheiromorph jaws could have been specialized for catching prey from the water without landing. This would have lowered the risk of crashing into the water.

=== Environment ===
The Toolebuc Formation was deposited in the southern edge of a late Albian Toolebuc Sea, which featured an anaerobic, relatively deep-water marine environment to the north and an aerobic, shallow-water marine and brackish environment to the south. Its paleofauna of pelagic (open ocean) invertebrates like ammonites, belemnites, and coleoids and the presence of benthic invertebrates suggests that most fossils derive from a shallow near-shore marine setting with poorly oxygenated water. This Toolebuc Sea was part of what now composes the Great Artesian Basin complex in the southern Tethys Ocean, an ancient sea that dissipated in the early-mid Cenozoic era.

Centred in Queensland, he Toolebuc Formation preserves most of Australia's pterosaur fossils, including those of the anhanguerians Haliskia, Mythunga, Thapunngaka, and an indeterminate taxon. Being an oceanic deposit, the Toolebuc Formation bears an array of marine reptile fossils including from the plesiosaurs Kronosaurus and Eromangasaurus, ichthyosaur Platypterygius, and the sea turtles Bouilachelys, Cratochelone, and Notochelone. Three dinosaurs, the parankylosaur Kunbarrasaurus, an unnamed sauropod, and the enantiornithean bird Nanantius have been reported as well. Many fish fossils have been discovered, such as those of the pachycormiform Australopachycormus, the ichthyodectid Cooyoo, the aspidorhyhnchid Richmondichthys, and the shark Pseudocorax.

== See also ==
- Timeline of pterosaur research
