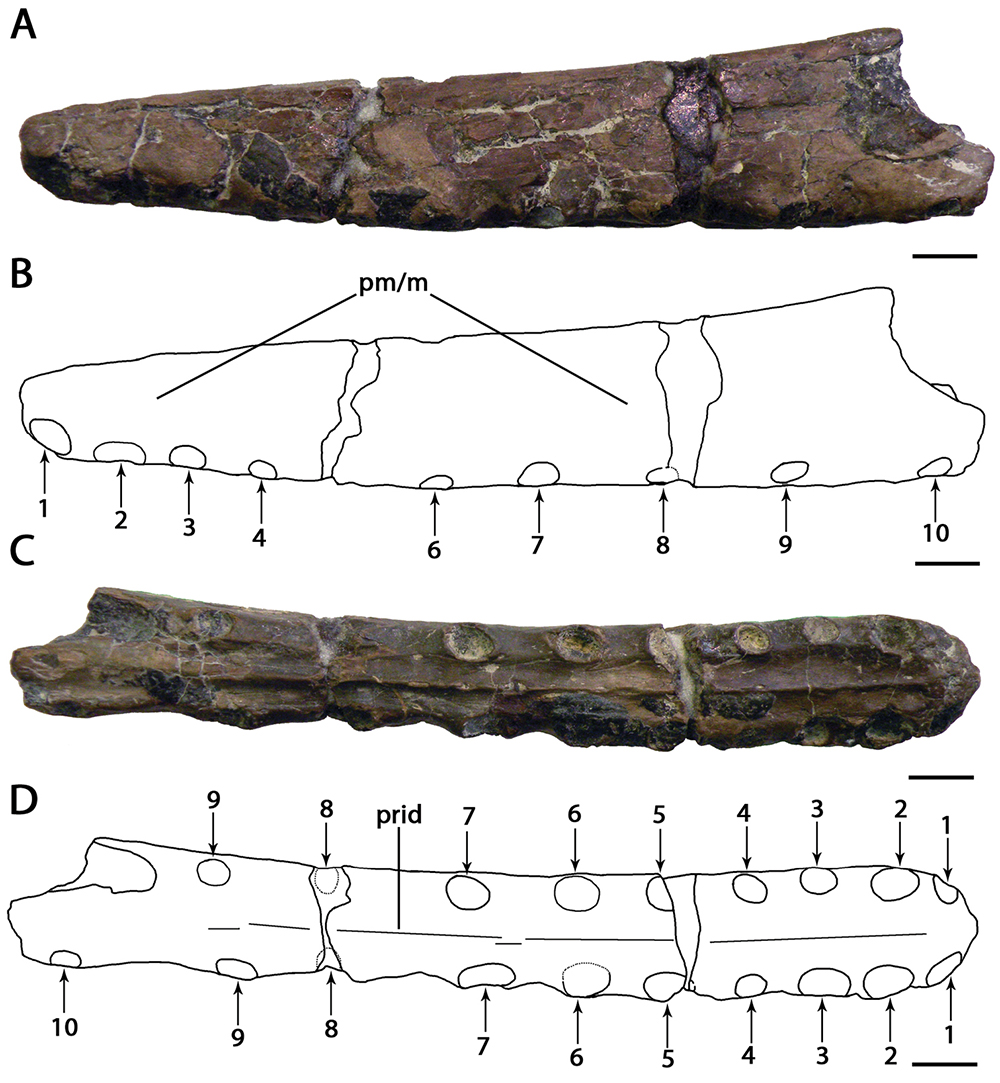
- C. nasutus holotype

Scientific classification
- Kingdom: Animalia
- Phylum: Chordata
- Class: Reptilia
- Order: †Pterosauria
- Suborder: †Pterodactyloidea
- Clade: †Ornithocheiriformes
- Clade: †Ornithocheirae
- Clade: †Targaryendraconia
- Family: †Cimoliopteridae
- Genus: †Camposipterus; Rodrigues & Kellner, 2013

Type species
- †Ornithocheirus nasutus Seeley, 1870

Species
- †C. nasutus (Seeley, 1870); †C.? sedgwickii (Owen, 1859)

Synonyms
- List of synonyms: Synonyms of C. nasutus; Ornithocheirus nasutus Seeley, 1870 Synonyms of C.? colorhinus; Ornithocheirus colorhinus Seeley, 1870 Synonyms of C.? sedgwickii; Aerodraco sedgwickii (Owen, 1859); Pterodactylus sedgwickii Owen, 1859; Ornithocheirus sedgwickii (Owen, 1859); Coloborhynchus sedgwickii (Owen, 1859)

= Camposipterus =

Camposipterus Temporal range: Early Cretaceous, 112 Ma

Genus of ornithocheiran pterosaur from the Early Cretaceous

Camposipterus is a genus of pterodactyloid pterosaur from the Early Cretaceous of England. Fossil remains of Camposipterus dated back to the Early Cretaceous, about 112 million years ago.

== Discovery and naming ==
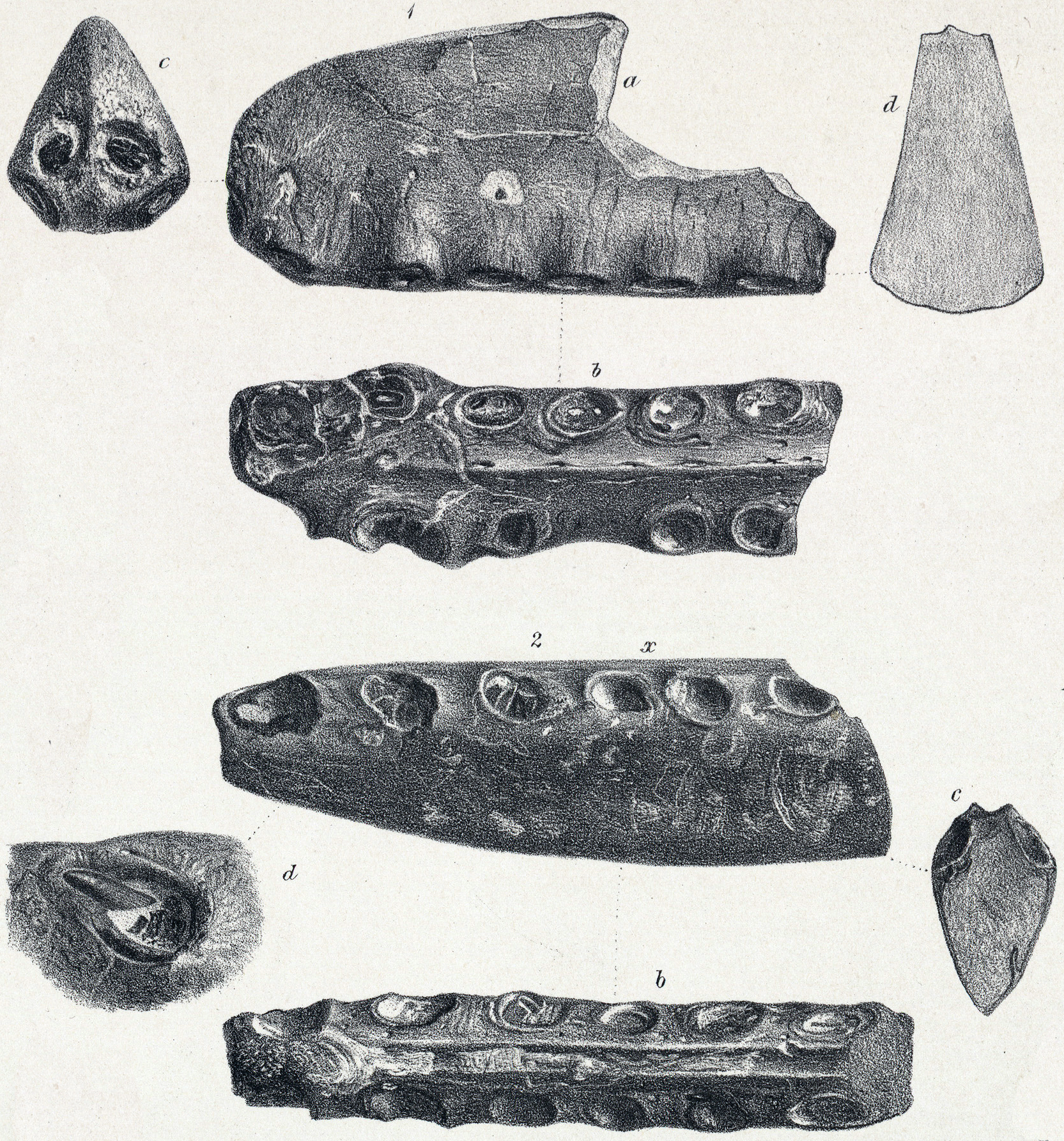
Holotype of C. sedgwickii, and a lower jaw Owen claimed belonged to the same specimen

In 1869, Harry Govier Seeley, based on a fossil found at Haslingfield, Cambridgeshire, named Ptenodactylus nasutus, at the same time disclaiming the name which makes it invalid by modern standards. In 1870, Seeley had realized that the generic name Ptenodactylus had been preoccupied, so he renamed the species into Ornithocheirus nasutus. The specific name means "with a long nose" in Latin. In 2001, David Unwin made this species a junior subjective synonym of Anhanguera fittoni. However, in 2013, Taissa Rodrigues and Alexander Wilhelm Armin Kellner concluded firstly that Pterodactylus fittoni was not a part of the genus Anhanguera and secondly that Ornithocheirus nasutus was not identical to it regardless. They decided to name a separate genus for the species: Camposipterus. The generic name combines that of the Brazilian paleontologist Diogenes de Almeida Campos with a Latinized Greek πτερόν, pteron, "wing". The resulting new combination name, the combinatio nova, which is Camposipterus nasutus, while the type species remains as Ornithocheirus nasutus.

The holotype, CAMSM B 54556, had been found in a layer of the Cambridge Greensand dating from the Cenomanian but probably containing reworked fossils from the older Albian. It consists of the front part of a snout.

Rodrigues & Kellner in 2013 moved two more species to the genus. They renamed Pterodactylus sedgwickii into Camposipterus(?) sedgwickii and Ornithocheirus colorhinus into Camposipterus(?) colorhinus. The question marks indicate the uncertainty of the authors about the correctness of the move.

Pterodactylus sedgwickii had in 1859 been named by Richard Owen based on specimen CAMSM B54422, the front part of a snout from the Cambridge Greensand. Its specific name honors Adam Sedgwick. It was in 1869 renamed by Seeley into a Ptenodactylus sedgwickii, and in 1870 into a Ornithocheirus sedgwickii. In 1874, Owen again renamed it into Coloborhynchus sedgwickii. Owen in 1859 also referred a front of the lower jaws, specimen CAMSM B54421. However, this piece is not of the same individual as the holotype and there is no proof for any connection with Pterodactylus sedgwickii.

In 1869, Seeley also named a Ptenodactylus colorhinus, in 1870 an Ornithocheirus colorhinus based on the syntypes CAMSM B54431 and CAMSM B54432, both front snouts from the Cambridge Greensand. Its specific name means "with a docked nose" from the Greek κόλος, kolos, "docked", and ῥίς. rhis, "nose". In 2001, Unwin considered this species to be a junior synonym of Anhanguera cuvieri. However, Rodrigues & Kellner rejected any identity between the Brazilian and English pterosaur material and named a separate taxon Cimoliopterus cuvieri, while tentatively assiging "O." colorhinus to Camposipterus. In 2025, Pêgas also assigned "O." colorhinus to the genus Cimoliopterus due to finding it closely related to C. cuvieri.

== Description ==
=== Camposipterus as a clade ===
Rodrigues & Kellner treated Camposipterus as a group or clade. No synapomorphies could be established but a unique combination of themselves not unique traits was present. In side view the snout is rounded. The snout bears no crest. The front part of the snout is expanded. The palate curves upwards. The first tooth pair is located in the snout tip.

Each of the species of Camposipterus has its own unique derived traits, autapomorphies, and a unique combination of traits.

=== Camposipterus nasutus ===
Rodrigues & Kellner established two autapomorphies of Camposipterus nasutus. At the front of the jaw edge there is a density of three teeth per 3 centimeters (1.2 in), at the rear a density of 2.5 teeth. The snout tip is flat, in front view wider than tall. There is a unique combination of traits: the upper profile of the snout is straight or lightly curved; the midline ridge on the palate is extended forwards until the level of the rear margins of the second tooth pair; to the rear the distance between the teeth gradually increases; the second and third tooth pairs are obliquely pointed sideways; the front of the snout is slightly expanded.

=== Camposipterus(?) sedgwickii ===
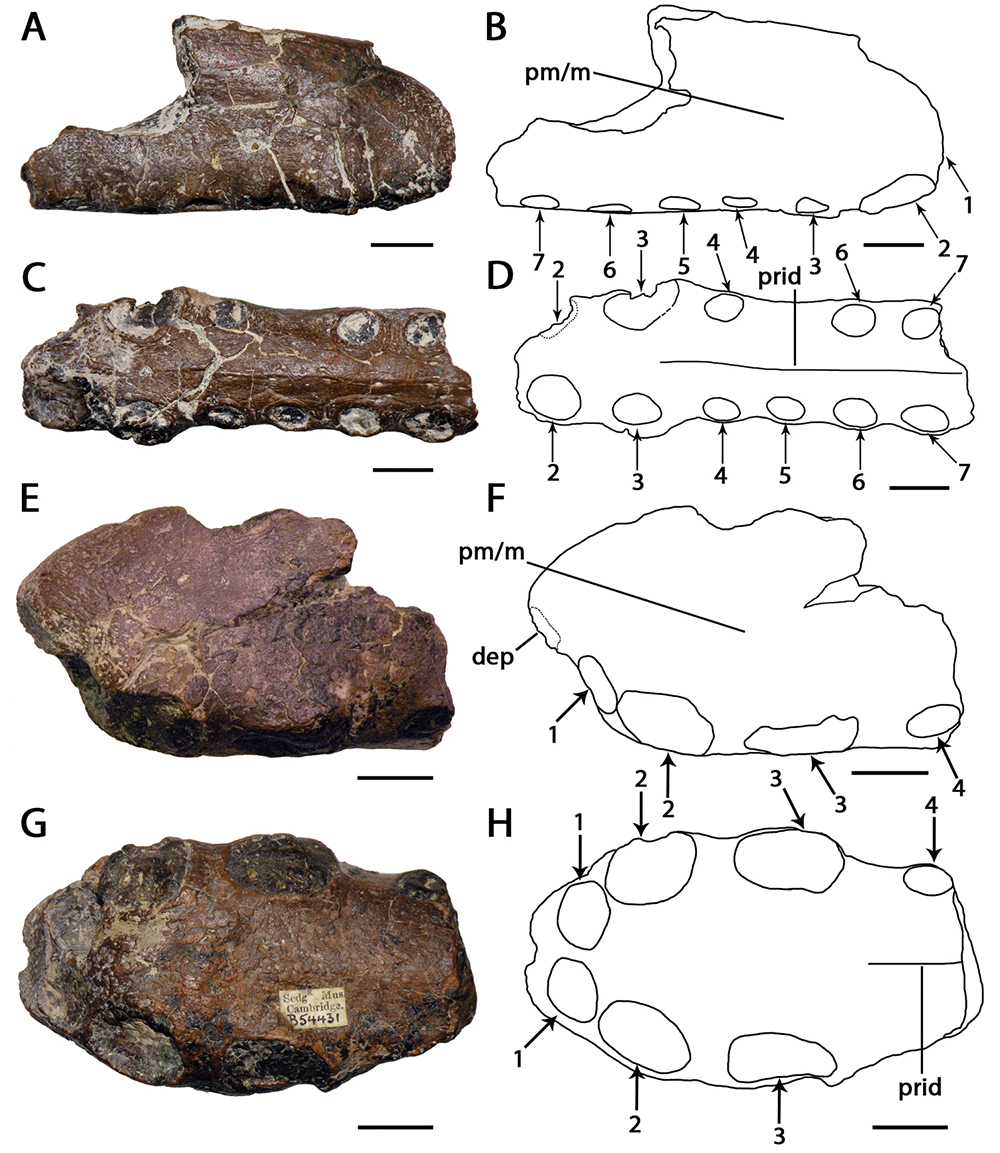
Holotype of C. sedgwickii and syntype of C. colorhinus

Rodrigues & Kellner established two autapomorphies of Camposipterus(?) sedgwickii. The expanded section of the front snout is suddenly constricted behind the third tooth pair. The tooth sockets of the third tooth pair are much larger than those of the fourth pair. There is a unique combination of traits: the snout is deep; the midline ridge on the palate towards the front reaches a position behind the third tooth pair. This species was reassigned to the genus Aerodraco in 2020.

== Phylogeny ==
Rodrigues and Kellner assigned Camposipterus to the clade Anhangueria, but incertae sedis, thus in an unknown position. Some cladistic analyses published in the naming article suggested a position in the evolutionary tree above Cimoliopterus and below Cearadactylus atrox. In 2019, Jacobs et al. published a phylogenetic analysis that placed Camposipterus within the family Ornithocheiridae, more specifically the sister taxon of Cimoliopterus. In the same year however, a study by Pêgas et al. placed Camposipterus within the clade Targaryendraconia, and specifically within the family Cimoliopteridae as the sister taxon of both Aetodactylus and Cimoliopterus:

Topology 1: Jacobs et al. (2019).

- Ornithocheirae
  - Anhangueridae
  - Ornithocheiridae
    - - - Coloborhynchus clavirostris
        - - Uktenadactylus wadleighi
          - - Coloborhynchus reedi
            - Coloborhynchus capito
            - - Coloborhynchus fluviferox
              - Coloborhynchus NHMUK R481
    - - - - Siroccopteryx moroccensis
          - - Ornithocheirus simus
            - Tropeognathus mesembrinus
        - - Camposipterus segwickii
          - Camposipterus colorhinus
          - - Camposipterus nasutus
            - - Cimoliopterus cuvieri
              - Cimoliopterus dunni

Topology 2: Pêgas et al. (2019).

- Ornithocheirae
  - Ornithocheirus
  - - Targaryendraconia
      - Targaryendraconidae
        - Aussiedraco
        - Barbosania
        - Targaryendraco
      - Cimoliopteridae
        - Aetodactylus
        - Camposipterus
        - Cimoliopterus
    - Anhangueria
      - Hamipteridae
        - Hamipterus
        - Iberodactylus
      - Anhangueridae
        - Tropeognathus
        - Coloborhynchinae
        - Anhanguerinae

The cladogram below showing internal relationships of Ornithocheiriformes including Targaryendraconia is reproduced from Pêgas (2025):

- Ornithocheiriformes
  - - Ornithocheiridae
      - Thapunngaka shawi
      - - Ornithocheirus simus
        - FSAC-KK 5025
          (Kem Kem beds, O. cf. simus)
  - - Anhangueroidea
      - Targaryendraconia
        - Targaryendraconidae
          - Targaryendraco wiedenrothi
          - - Barbosania gracilirostris
            - Aussiedraco molnari
        - Cimoliopteridae
          - - Camposipterus nasutus
            - Aetodactylus halli
          - - Cimoliopterus dunni
            - - Cimoliopterus colorhinus
              - Cimoliopterus cuvieri
      - Anhangueria
        ⊞
        - Hamipteridae
          - Iberodactylus
          - Hamipterus
        - Anhangueridae
          - Tropeognathinae
            - Tropeognathus
            - - - Haliskia
                - Ferrodraco
              - - Aerodraco
                - - Akharhynchus
                  - Siroccopteryx
          - - Coloborhynchinae
              - Coloborhynchus
              - - Uktenadactylus spp.
                - Nicorhynchus spp.
            - Anhanguerinae
              - - Caulkicephalus
                - - Guidraco
                  - Ludodactylus
              - - Liaoningopterus
                - - - Brasileodactylus
                    - Maaradactylus
                  - Anhanguera spp.
        ⊟

== See also ==
- List of pterosaur genera
- Timeline of pterosaur research
