= Tarrant Formation =

Geologic formation in Texas, United States

- Stratigraphic range: Middle Cenomanian
- Type: Geological formation
- Unit of: Eagle Ford Group

Lithology
- Primary: Calcareous sandstone
- Other: Siltstone, limestone, shale

Location
- Region: Texas
- Country: United States

The Tarrant Formation is a geologic formation that dates to the Middle Cenomanian stage of the Late Cretaceous.

== Paleobiota ==
- Aetodactylus
