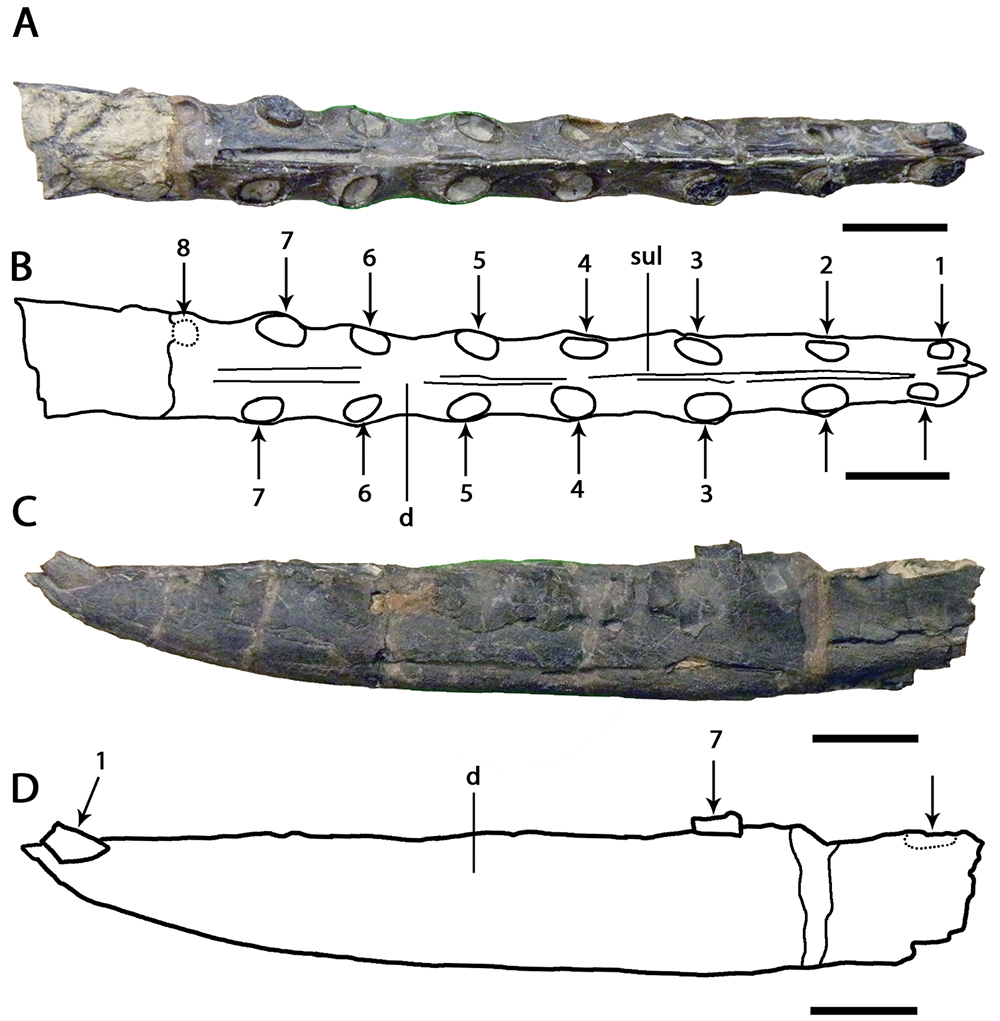
- Mandible of Targaryendraco

Scientific classification
- Kingdom: Animalia
- Phylum: Chordata
- Order: †Pterosauria
- Suborder: †Pterodactyloidea
- Clade: †Ornithocheirae
- Clade: †Targaryendraconia; Pêgas et al., 2019

Subgroups
- †Saratovia; †Cimoliopteridae; †Aetodactylus?; †Camposipterus?; †Cimoliopterus; †Targaryendraconidae; †Aussiedraco; †Barbosania; †Targaryendraco

= Targaryendraconia =

Targaryendraconians Temporal range: Hauterivian-Cenomanian, 132–94 Ma

Clade of ornithocheiran pterosaurs

Targaryendraconia is an extinct clade of lanceodontian pterosaurs that lived from the Early to Late Cretaceous period in Europe, North America, South America, and Australia.

== Classification ==
Below is a cladogram following a topology by Pêgas and colleagues in 2019. In their analysis, they recovered Targaryendraconia as the sister taxon of the clade Anhangueria, both of which are within the more inclusive group Ornithocheirae. Targaryendraconia is split into two families: the Targaryendraconidae, which contains Aussiedraco, Barbosania, and Targaryendraco, and the Cimoliopteridae, which contains Aetodactylus, Camposipterus, and Cimoliopterus.

- Ornithocheirae
  - Ornithocheirus simus
  - - Targaryendraconia
      - Targaryendraconidae
        - Aussiedraco molnari
        - Barbosania gracilirostris
        - Targaryendraco wiedenrothi
      - Cimoliopteridae
        - Aetodactylus halli
        - Camposipterus nasutus
        - - Cimoliopterus cuvieri
          - Cimoliopterus dunni
    - Anhangueria
      - Hamipteridae
        - Hamipterus tianshanensis
        - Iberodactylus andreui
      - Anhangueridae
        - Tropeognathinae
        - Coloborhynchinae
        - Anhanguerinae

Contrastingly, a study by Alexander Averianov in 2025, describing the new targaryendraconian Saratovia, failed to recover the existence of a cimoliopterid clade. Instead, Cimoliopterus cuvieri, Cimoliopterus dunni, Saratovia, and a grouping of Camposipterus and Aetodactylus formed an unresolved polytomy with Targaryendraconidae. He argued that the distinction between the two groups of targaryendraconian were likely caused due to the incompleteness of known remains; cimoliopterids are characterized by traits of the upper jaw, and targaryendraconids by those of the lower jaw. Most of the known genera are only known from upper or lower jaw, and the complete skull of Barbosania is preserved in a manner preventing study of the interior surface of the jaw. It was also noted that several uniting characteristics of Anhangueria and Anhangueridae are not evaluable in most or all members of Targaryendraconia.
