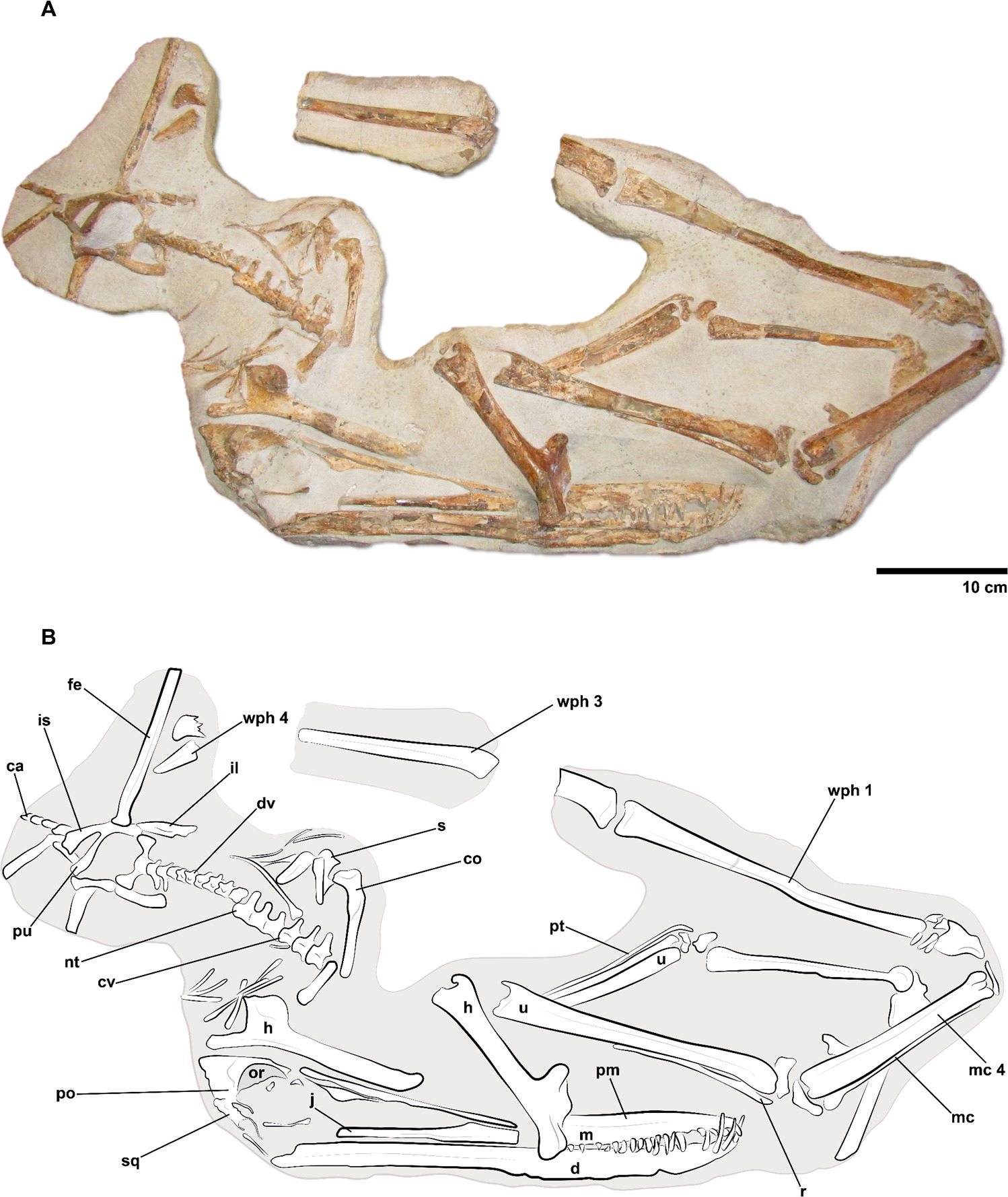
- Holotype specimen

Scientific classification
- Kingdom: Animalia
- Phylum: Chordata
- Class: Reptilia
- Order: †Pterosauria
- Suborder: †Pterodactyloidea
- Clade: †Ornithocheiriformes
- Clade: †Ornithocheirae
- Clade: †Targaryendraconia
- Family: †Targaryendraconidae
- Genus: †Barbosania; Elgin & Frey, 2011

Type species
- †Barbosania gracilirostris Elgin & Frey, 2011

= Barbosania =

Barbosania Temporal range: Aptian-Albian ~112 Ma

Genus of targaryendraconian pterosaur from the Early Cretaceous

Barbosania is an extinct genus of crestless targaryendraconian pterosaur from the Cretaceous Romualdo Formation of the Santana Group of northeastern Brazil, dating to the Aptian to Albian.

== Discovery and naming ==
Barbosania was named and described by Ross A. Elgin and Eberhard Frey in 2011 and the type species is Barbosania gracilirostris. The generic name honours Professor Miguel Barbosa of the Portuguese Museu de História Natural de Sintra in whose collection the type specimen is present. The specific epithet is derived from Latin rostrum, "snout", and gracilis, "slender", in reference to the slender form of the anterior skull.

The holotype, MNHS/00/85, was originally acquired for Barbosa's personal collection, the basis of the new Sintra museum, from Brazilian fossil poachers. Its provenance is probably the Serra da Mãozinha, implying an Early Cretaceous late Albian age, about a hundred million years old. It consists of an almost complete skeleton including the skull, that is partially articulated and uncompressed. The lower legs and most of the neck are missing. The specimen was prepared in the German Staatliches Museum für Naturkunde Karlsruhe. It is probably of a subadult individual, though the closure of the respective sutures provides somewhat contradictory information, the fusion of some elements indicating it was full-grown.

Several specimens previously referred to Brasileodactylus may instead be individuals of Barbosania.

== Description ==
Barbosania was a medium-sized pterodactyloid with a skull length of 392 millimetres, or 15.4 inches. Its body was 209.5 millimetres, or 8.2 inches long. The skull is elongated with a slight upwards bend in the snout. Its lack of a rostral and dentary median sagittal crest allows a distinction from other related pterosaurs. Also a parietal crest on top of the skull is absent. The authors considered it unlikely that this morphology was age-related and rejected the explanation of such traits by sexual dimorphism unless there was specific evidence to prove this. The describers established a single autapomorphy, unique trait: the possession of thirteen dorsal vertebrae instead of the normal twelve. The first four tooth pairs are extremely long, forming a rosette to catch slippery prey like fish or squids. This rosette is however not laterally expanded, which was reflected in the specific name. There are at least twenty-four teeth in the upper jaw and twenty in the lower jaw for a total of eighty-eight.

== Classification ==
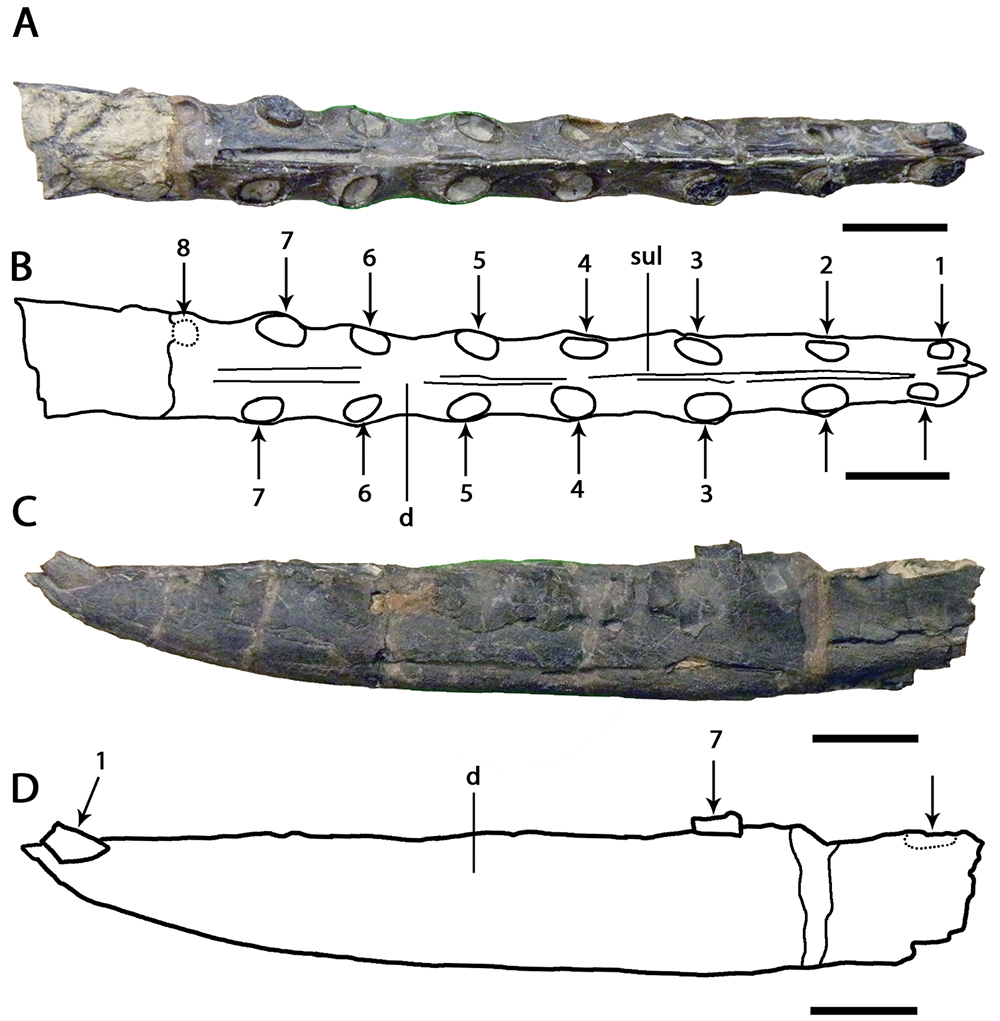
Holotype specimen of Targaryendraco, a fellow targaryendraconid

Barbosania was assigned to the Ornithocheiroidea sensu Unwin and more precisely to the Ornithocheiridae.

In 2019, Pêgas et al. assigned Barbosania to the clade Targaryendraconia, more specifically to the family Targaryendraconidae, as shown below:

- Ornithocheirae
  - Ornithocheirus
  - - Targaryendraconia
      - Targaryendraconidae
        - Aussiedraco
        - Barbosania
        - Targaryendraco
      - Cimoliopteridae
        - Aetodactylus
        - Camposipterus
        - Cimoliopterus
    - Anhangueria
      - Hamipteridae
        - Hamipterus
        - Iberodactylus
      - Anhangueridae
        - Tropeognathus
        - Coloborhynchinae
        - Anhanguerinae

== See also ==
- List of pterosaur genera
- Timeline of pterosaur research
