= Kirgizemys =

Kirgizemys Temporal range: Early Cretaceous

Scientific classification
- Kingdom: Animalia
- Phylum: Chordata
- Class: Reptilia
- Clade: Pantestudines
- Clade: Testudinata
- Family: †Macrobaenidae
- Genus: †Kirgizemys; Nessov & Khozatsky, 1973

Species
- K. exaratus Nessov & Khozsatzky, 1973; K. dmitrievi Nessov & Khozsatzky, 1981; K. hoburensis (Sukhanov & Narmandakh, 1974); K. kansuensis (Bohlin, 1953); K. leptis (Sukhanov & Narmandakh, 2006)

Synonyms
- Hangaiemys Sukhanov & Narmandakh, 1974

Extinct genus of turtles

Kirgizemys is an extinct genus of turtle from Early Cretaceous of China, South Korea, Mongolia, Russia and Kyrgyzstan.
