= Yixianopterus =

Yixianopterus Temporal range: Early Cretaceous, 124.6 Ma

Scientific classification
- Kingdom: Animalia
- Phylum: Chordata
- Class: Reptilia
- Order: †Pterosauria
- Suborder: †Pterodactyloidea
- Clade: †Istiodactyliformes
- Genus: †Yixianopterus; Lü et al., 2006

Type species
- †Yixianopterus jingangshanensis Lü et al., 2006

Genus of pteranodontoid pterosaur from the Early Cretaceous

Yixianopterus is a pterodactyloid pterosaur genus from the Barremian-Aptian-age Lower Cretaceous Yixian Formation of Liaoning, China. It is known from a single specimen, holotype JZMP-V-12, housed at the Benxi Geological Museum. This specimen was modified before acquisition, with much of the skull being fabricated. The Jinggangshan bedding in which the specimen was found is basaltic with siliciclastic sediments. Many organisms associated with this layer of the Yixian Formation are aquatic, indicating a marine environment with much volcanic activity.

== Classification ==
Lü et al. (2006) assigned Yixianopterus to the Lophocratian family Lonchodectidae based on dental characters, and ratio comparisons between wing phalanx I and II, metacarpal IV, and ulna. This specimen was classified it as the first Asian representative of Lonchodectidae. Martill (2011) considered it potentially related to his new taxon Unwindia, and Witton (2013) assigned it to the family Ornithocheiridae.

A reappraisal of the holotype specimen and phylogenetic analysis by Jiang et al. (2020) recovered Yixianopterus as a basal member of the clade Istiodactyliformes:

- Lanceodontia
  - Istiodactyliformes
    - Haopterus
    - Linlongopterus
    - Mimodactylus
    - Yixianopterus
    - - Hongshanopterus
      - Istiodactylidae
        - Nurhachius
        - - Liaoxipterus
          - Istiodactylus
  - - Ikrandraco
    - - Lonchodraco
      - - Ornithocheirus
        - - Cimoliopterus
          - Anhangueria

== Holotype JZMP-V-12 ==
Holotype JZMP-V-12 was discovered within the Jinggangshan bedding, the uppermost layer of the Yixian Formation. Many Jehol Biota associated with the Jinggangshan bedding are fish, ephemerid, and plant fragments. The holotype found contained fragmented segments leading to its classification as a new genus and species of flying reptile from the Early Cretaceous. Preserved segments include the right forelimb, a foot, and teeth.

The recovered right forelimb segment contained two broad, thin plates each measuring 35 cm x 35 cm x 2 cm. The conditions under which the holotype was preserved crushed the ends of the right humerus, but what remains is 101.6 mm long. The deltopectoral crest of the upper humerus, extending a quarter of the length (25.38mm), characterized the specimen as belonging to Pteranodontoidea.

The foot of holotype JZMP-V-12 was found in a well-preserved condition. Metatarsal III is 28.19mm long while what was preserved of the tibia is 102.63 mm in length. Kellner et al. (2019) identified the ratio as less than 27.5%, a typical characteristic of the clade Ornithocheiroidea.

Lü et al. (2006) identified the ratios between wing phalanx I and II, wing phalanx I and metacarpal IV, and metacarpal IV and ulna, as being unique to Yixianopterus.

Lü et al. (2006) noted that the teeth of the specimen were subequal with diastema increasing posteriorly. Kellner et al. (2019) identified the triangular and labiolingually compressed teeth as a characteristic of Pteranodontoidea. The front two incisors are particularly more slender and longer than the rest.

An outline of the head preserved within the sediment showed a dorsal inclination. This would indicate that the shape of the skull is rather narrow where the mouth opening is, with the majority of the skull surrounding the brain.
