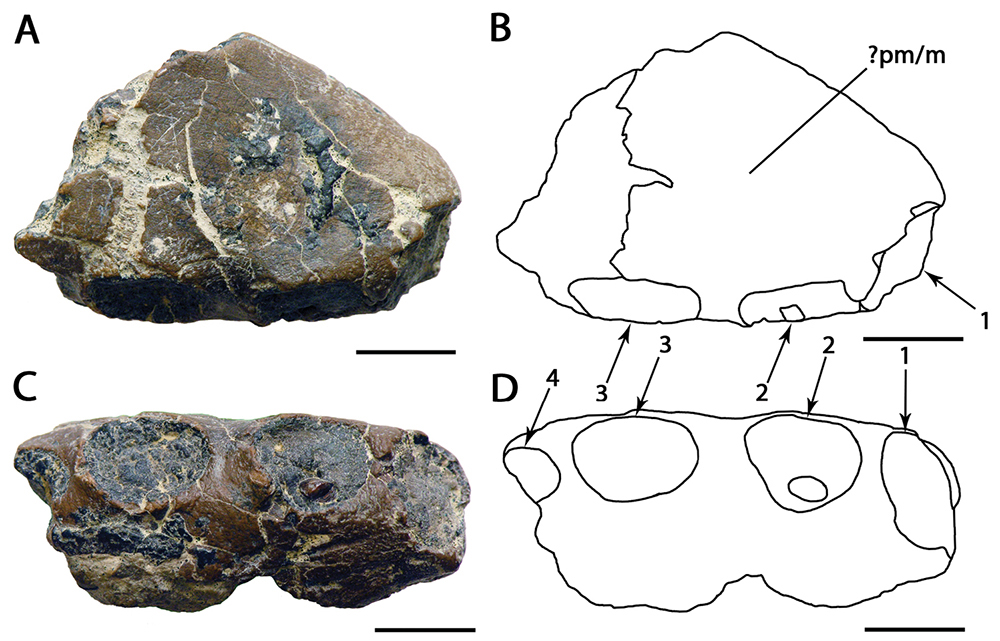
- A. crassidens holotype

Scientific classification
- Kingdom: Animalia
- Phylum: Chordata
- Class: Reptilia
- Order: †Pterosauria
- Suborder: †Pterodactyloidea
- Family: †Anhangueridae
- Subfamily: †Tropeognathinae
- Genus: †Amblydectes; Hooley, 1914

Type species
- †Ornithocheirus crassidens Seeley, 1870

Species
- †A. crassidens (Seeley, 1870)

Synonyms
- Ornithocheirus crassidens Seeley, 1870; Ornithocheirus eurygnathus Seeley, 1870; Amblydectes eurygnathus Seeley, 1870

= Amblydectes =

Amblydectes Temporal range: Cenomanian

Extinct genus of reptiles

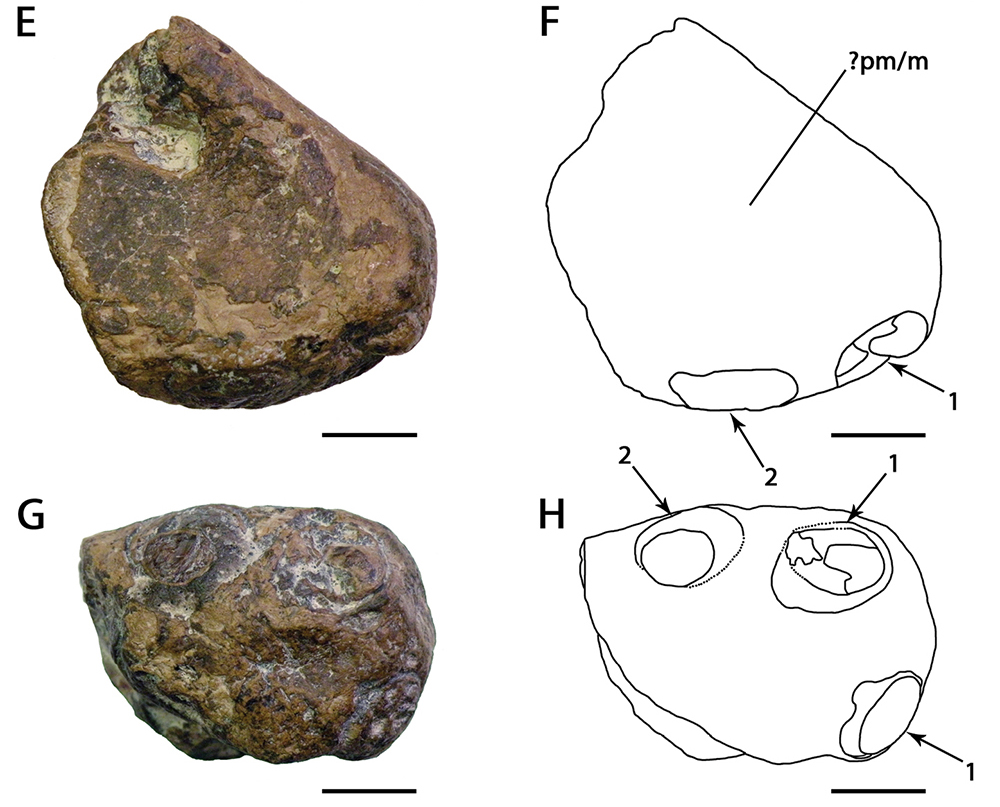
A. eurygnathus holotype, a possible synonym of A. crassidens

Amblydectes is a genus of pterosaur known from jaw fragments found in the Cambridge Greensand. It apparently had a jaw flattened towards the tip and triangular in cross-section. It has at times been synonymized with Coloborhynchus, Criorhynchus, Lonchodectes, or Ornithocheirus. A 2013 study found A. crassidens and A. eurygnathus to be nomina dubia, with A. platystomus possibly belonging to a separate, yet unnamed genus. A 2021 study found A. crassidens to be a valid genus within Anhangueridae, while A. platystomus was placed in the new genus Draigwenia. A. eurygnathus was found to possibly be a junior synonym of A. crassidens.

== See also ==
- Timeline of pterosaur research
