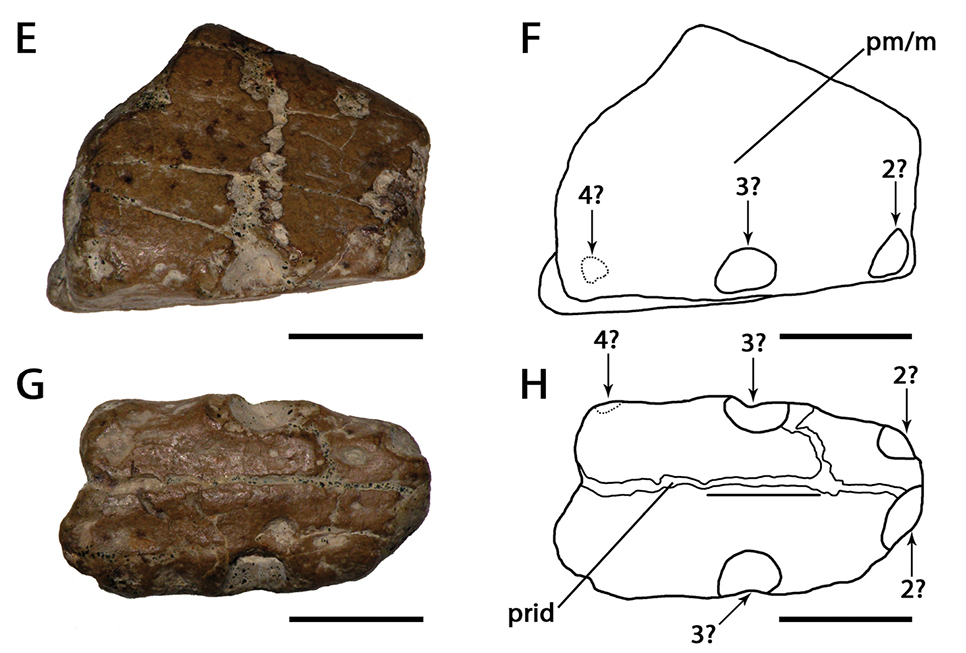
- D. platystomus holotype

Scientific classification
- Kingdom: Animalia
- Phylum: Chordata
- Class: Reptilia
- Order: †Pterosauria
- Suborder: †Pterodactyloidea
- Clade: †Lanceodontia
- Genus: †Draigwenia; Holgado, 2021

Type species
- †Ornithocheirus platystomus Seeley, 1870

Synonyms
- Lonchodectes platystomus (Seeley, 1870); Amblydectes platystomus (Seeley, 1870)

= Draigwenia =

Draigwenia Temporal range: Early Cretaceous, Albian

Extinct genus of pterosaur

Draigwenia (meaning "white dragon" from the Welsh ddraig wen, referring to a dragon associated with the Anglo-Saxons) is an extinct genus of pterosaur known from a jaw fragment found in the Late Cretaceous Cambridge Greensand in the United Kingdom. The fossil was likely reworked from an Early Cretaceous layer that can be dated to the Albian. It currently contains a single species, Draigwenia platystomus.

== History ==
The holotype CAMSM B54835, was described in 1870 by Harry Govier Seeley as the holotype of his species Ornithocheirus platystomus. In 1914 Reginald Walter Hooley moved O. platystomus to Amblydectes. It was assigned by David Unwin in 2001 to the genus Lonchodectes, and in 2013 was excluded from the Lonchodraconidae. In a 2021 review of the genus Amblydectes, Borja Holgado considered platystomus a valid taxon and gave it its own genus, Draigwenia, reinterpreting it as an indeterminate member of Lanceodontia.
