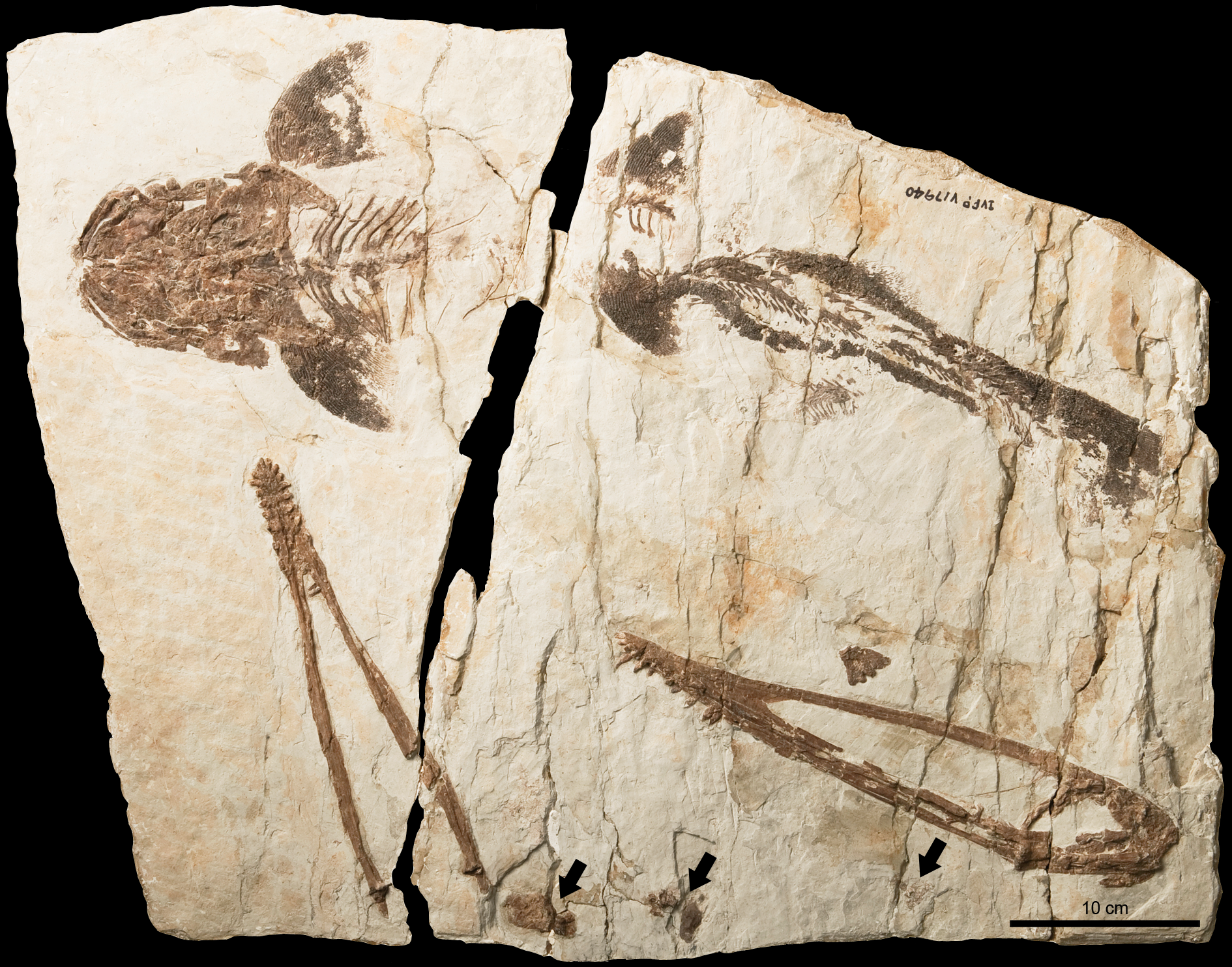
- Holotype of Lingyuanopterus (IVPP V 17940) with a peipiaosteid fish above

Scientific classification
- Kingdom: Animalia
- Phylum: Chordata
- Class: Reptilia
- Order: †Pterosauria
- Suborder: †Pterodactyloidea
- Family: †Istiodactylidae
- Genus: †Lingyuanopterus; Xu et al., 2022

Type species
- †Lingyuanopterus camposi Xu et al., 2022

= Lingyuanopterus =

Lingyuanopterus Temporal range: Aptian

Genus of istiodactylid pterosaur from the Early Cretaceous

Lingyuanopterus (lit. 'Lingyuan wing') is a genus of istiodactylid pterosaur from the Aptian age Jiufotang Formation in western Liaoning, China. The type and only species is L. camposi, known from the holotype specimen IVPP V 17940 a near complete skull, mandible and atlas-axis complex.

== Etymology ==
Lingyuanopterus was named and described in 2022 by Xu et al., (2022). The type species is L. camposi. The generic name is derived from the locality in which the holotype specimen was found 'Lingyuan' and the Latinized Greek noun 'pterus', meaning 'wing'. The specific name 'camposi' honours Brazilian vertebrate paleontologist Diogenes de Almeida Campos for his contribution to China-Brazil pterosaur collaborative research.

== Description ==
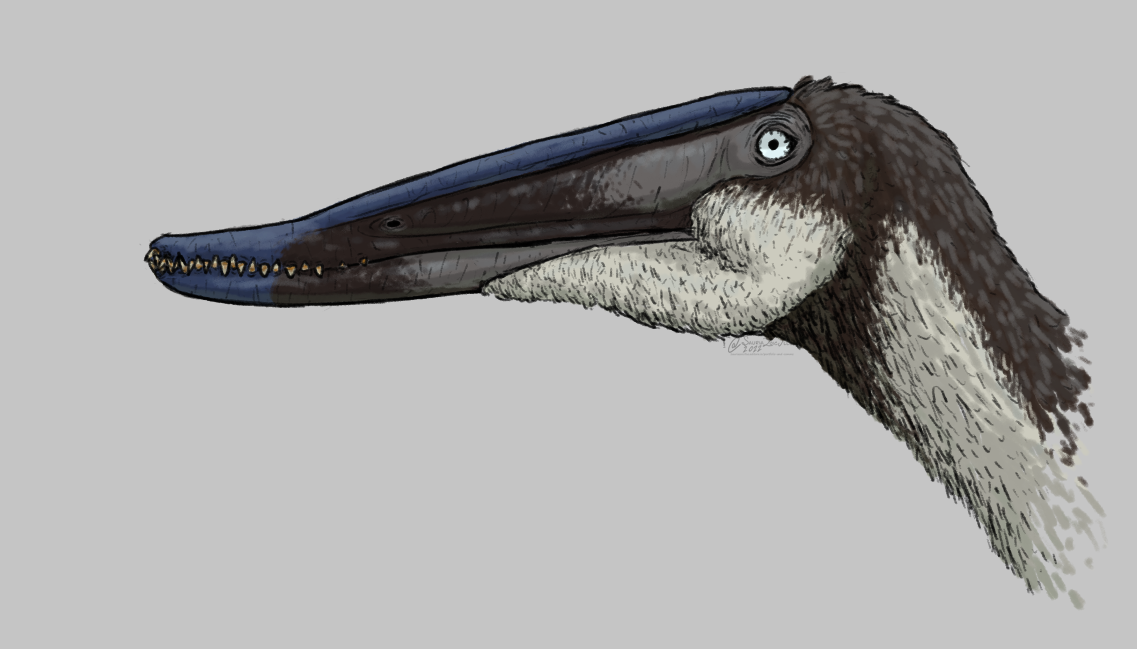
Life reconstruction of head

Lingyuanopterus dimensions
Dimension	Metric	Imperial
Skull length	≈306.8 mm	≈12.08 in
Mandible length	≈248.6 mm	≈9.79 in
Prejoint-skull length	≈236.9 mm	≈9.33 in
Skull dorsoventral height	≈51.1 mm	≈2.01 in
Mandibular symphysis length	≈64.8 mm	≈2.55 in
Rostral length	≈83.5 mm	≈3.29 in
Nasoantorbital fenestra anteroposterior length (Note: It occupies approximately 48.7% of total skull length.)	≈149.3 mm	≈5.88 in
Nasoantorbital fenestra dorsoventral height	≈35.6 mm	≈1.40 in
Upper tooth row length	≈83.8 mm	≈3.30 in
Lower tooth row length	≈71.9 mm	≈2.83 in

Lingyuanopterus is only known from the holotype IVPP V 17940, which consists of a nearly complete skull, a nearly complete mandible, and an atlas-axis complex. The dorsal margin of the skull is smooth and slightly curved, with no parietal crest/sagittal crest. The rostrum is slightly deflected dorsally, with its anterior end thicker at the ventral margin. The bones on the right side of the skull are ventrally displaced due to its preservation.

== Classification ==
In Xu et al., (2022) Lingyuanopterus is recovered as an istiodactylid pterosaur.

Cladogram after Xu et al., (2022):

- Istiodactyliformes
  - Lonchodectidae
  - - Mimodactylidae
    - - Hongshanopterus
      - Istiodactylidae
        - Nurhachius
        - - Lingyuanopterus
          - - Luchibang
            - - Istiodactylinae

== Paleobiology ==
Xu et al., (2022) suggest that Lingyuanopterus was adapted for scavenging, citing several features including the well-interlocked labiolingually compressed teeth, slender maxillae, shallow rostra and mandibular symphyses and long retroarticular processes.
