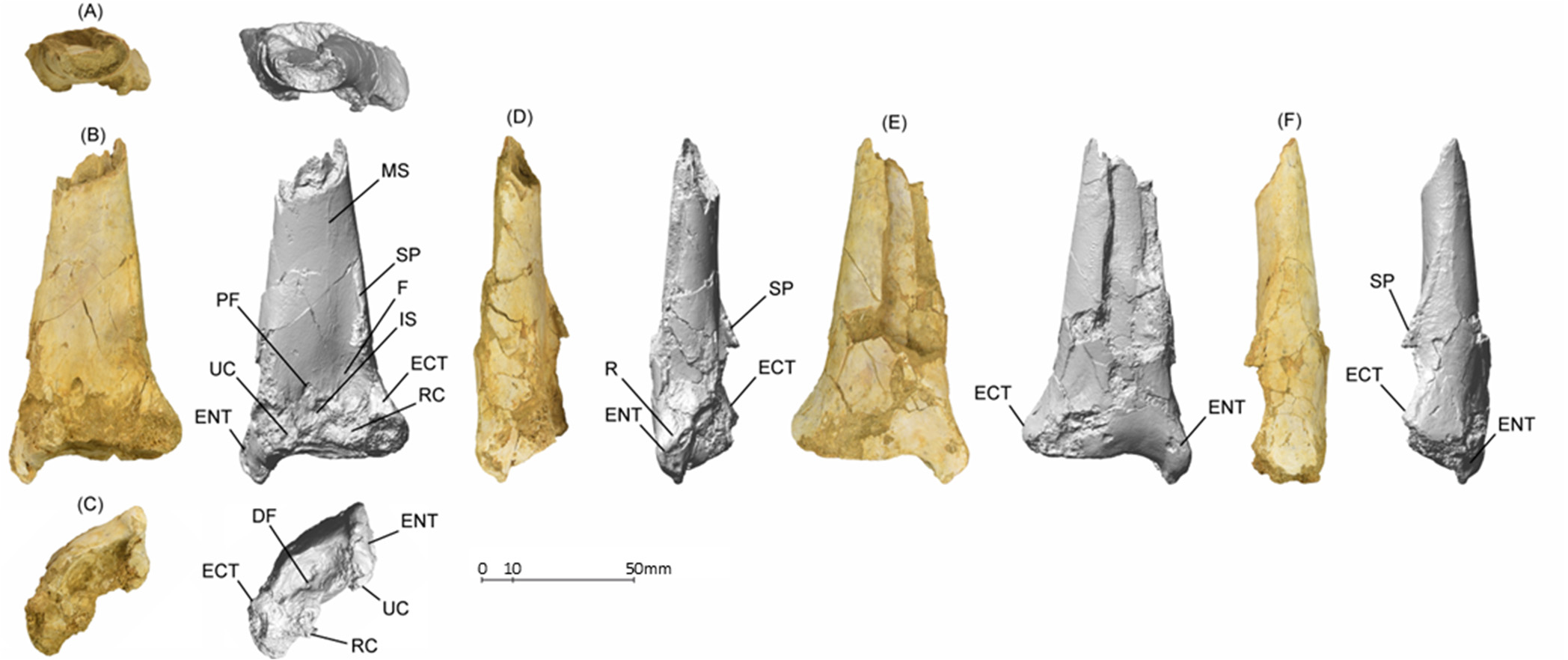
- Holotype humerus
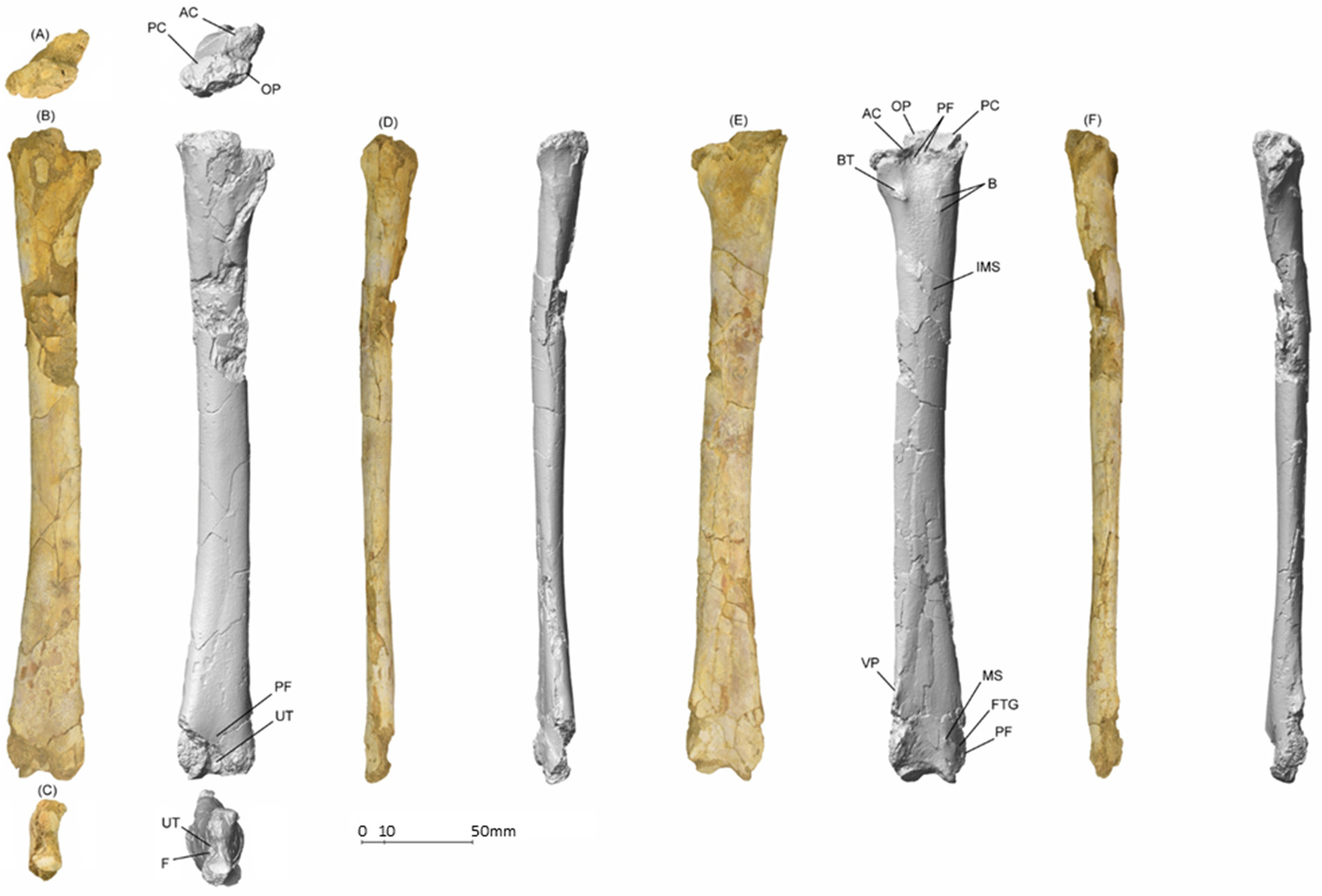
- Holotype ulna

Scientific classification
- Domain: Eukaryota
- Kingdom: Animalia
- Phylum: Chordata
- Order: †Pterosauria
- Suborder: †Pterodactyloidea
- Clade: †Aponyctosauria
- Genus: †Epapatelo; Fernandes et al., 2022
- Species: †E. otyikokolo

Binomial name
- †Epapatelo otyikokolo Fernandes et al., 2022

= Epapatelo =

Epapatelo Temporal range: Late Cretaceous, Lower (Maastrichtian)

Genus of pteranodontian pterosaur

Epapatelo (meaning "wing") is a genus of pteranodontian pterosaur from the late Cretaceous Mocuio Formation of Namibe Province, Angola. The genus contains a single species, E. otyikokolo, known from partial left limb bones.

== Discovery and naming ==
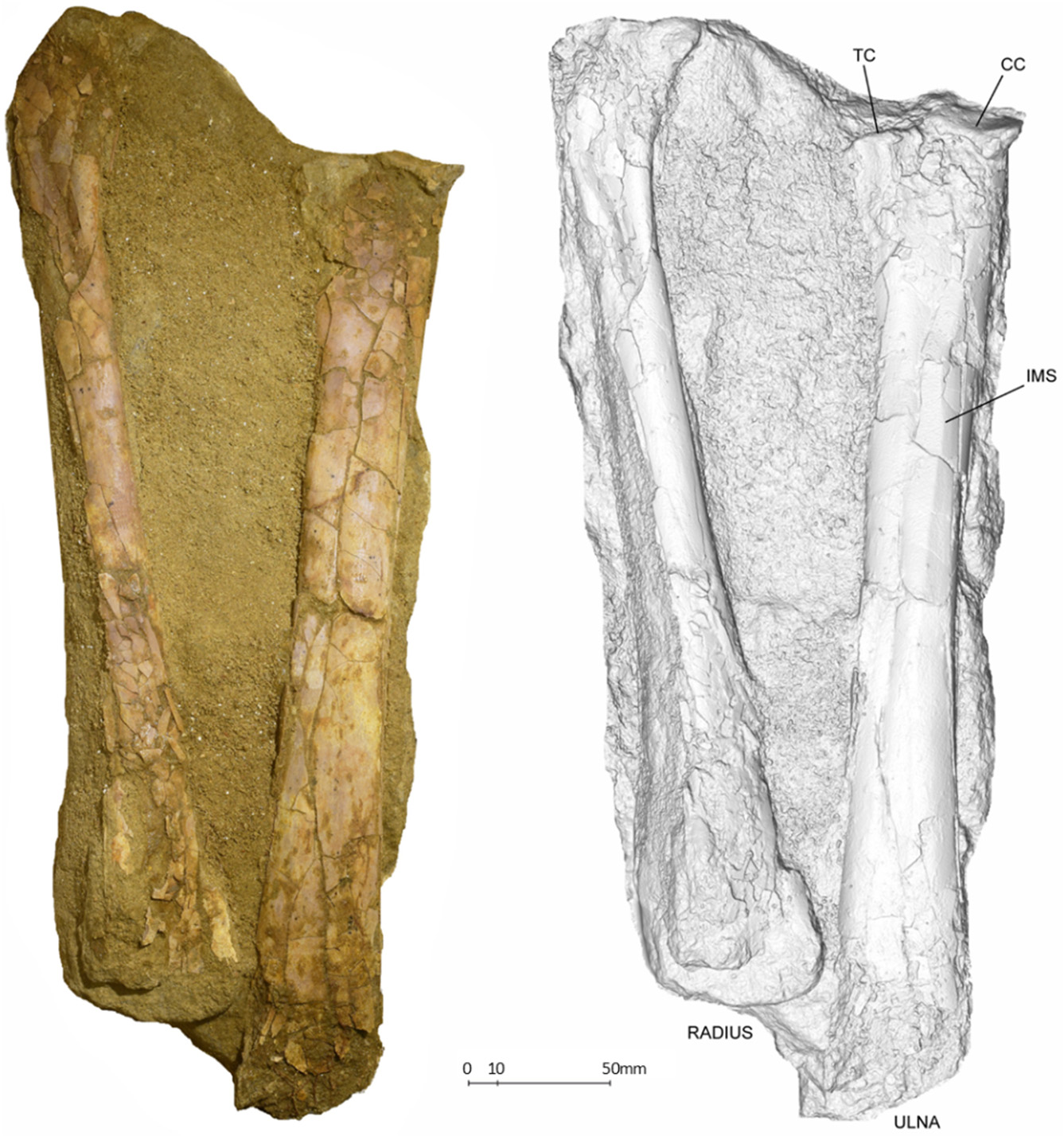
Epapatelo paratype (MPUAN-PA661)

Epapatelo type locality in Namibe Province, Angola

Since 2005, the Projecto PaleoAngola carried out excavations at Bentiaba. For the first time in history, remains of pterosaurs were found in Angola. The recovered fossils consist of fourteen specimens of at least eleven individuals. Two of these represent the new taxon Epapatelo.

In 2022, the type species Epapatelo otyikokolo was named and described by Alexandra E. Fernandes, Octávio Mateus, Brian Andres, Michael J. Polcyn, Anne S. Schulp, António Olímpio, Gonçalves and Louis L. Jacobs. The scientific name is derived from Nhaneca, the language of the local nomadic population. The generic name, Epapatelo, means "wing", and the specific name, otyikokolo, means "lizard".

The holotype, MGUAN-PA650, was found in a sandstone layer of the Mocuio Formation, a marine deposit dating from the early Maastrichtian, between 71.64 and 71.4 million years old. It consists of a partial left humerus articulated with a left ulna. The paratype, MGUAN-PA661, represents an articulated left ulna and radius. All of these bones are preserved three-dimensionally, without significant compression. They were recovered from a surface area of fifteen hectares. The plesiosaur Cardiocorax was also found in the Mocuio Formation.

== Description ==
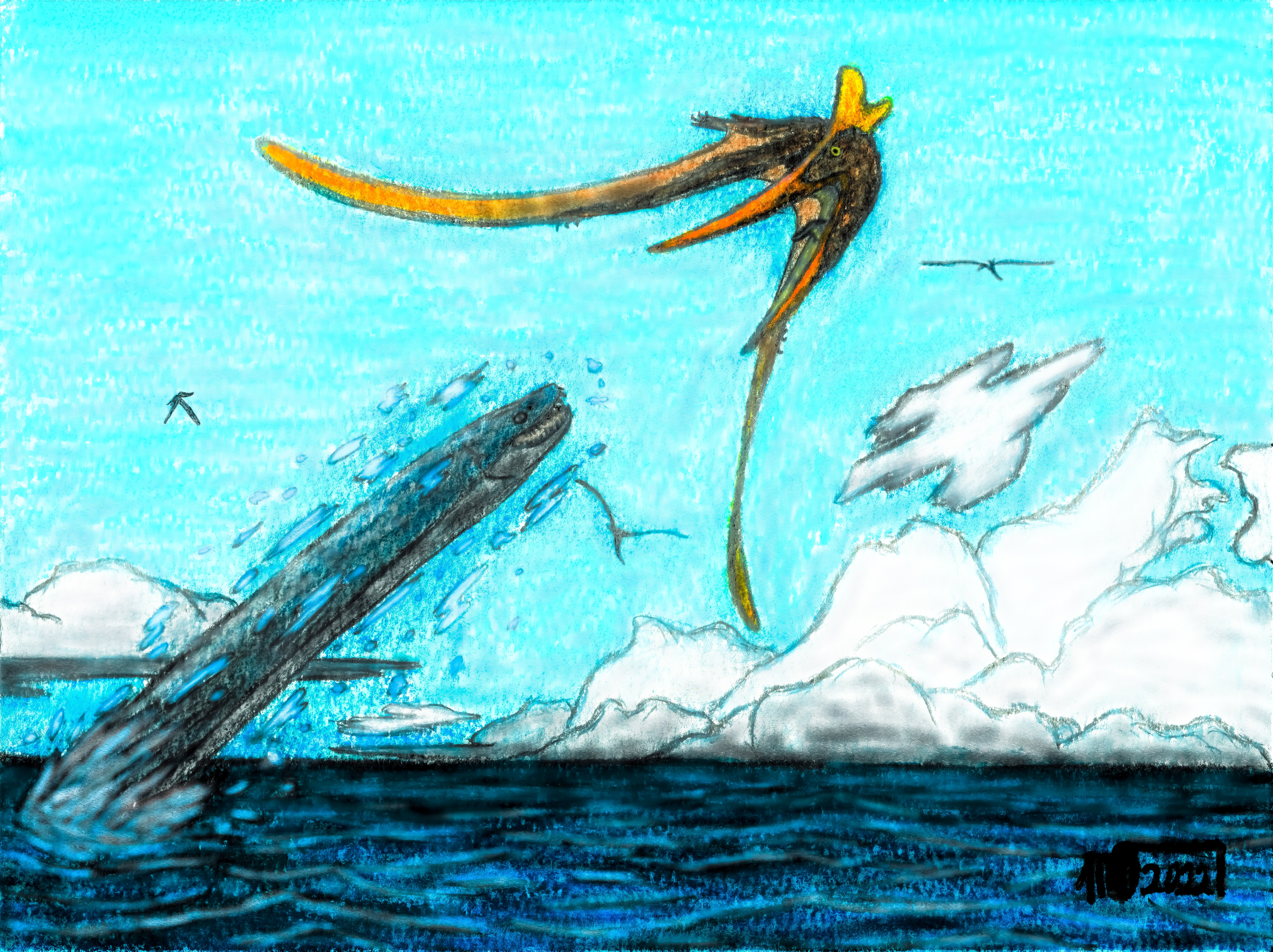
Life restoration with the contemporary Cardiocorax

The wingspan of the holotype was estimated at 4.8 m (16 ft). The paratype would have been a larger individual, at 5.6 m (18 ft). Some of the material found at Bentiaba suggests an even larger size. The fourth metacarpal of the holotype was extrapolated at about 46 cm (18 in) in length. Elsewhere in Angola, a partial manual digit IV has been found that is at least 83 cm (33 in).

== Classification ==
In their phylogenetic analyses, Fernandes et al. (2022) recovered Epapatelo as the sister taxon to Simurghia and Alcione. These taxa, along with the Nyctosauridae, comprise the clade Aponyctosauria.

- Pteranodontia
  - - Tethydraco
    - - Pteranodon longiceps
      - Pteranodon sternbergi (Geosternbergia)
  - - Alamodactylus
    - Volgadraco
    - - Cretornis
      - Aponyctosauria
        - - Epapatelo
          - Simurghia
          - Alcione
        - Nyctosauridae
          - Muzquizopteryx
          - - - Nyctosaurus lamegoi
              - Nyctosaurus grandis (Barbaridactylus)
            - - Nyctosaurus nanus
              - Nyctosaurus gracilis
