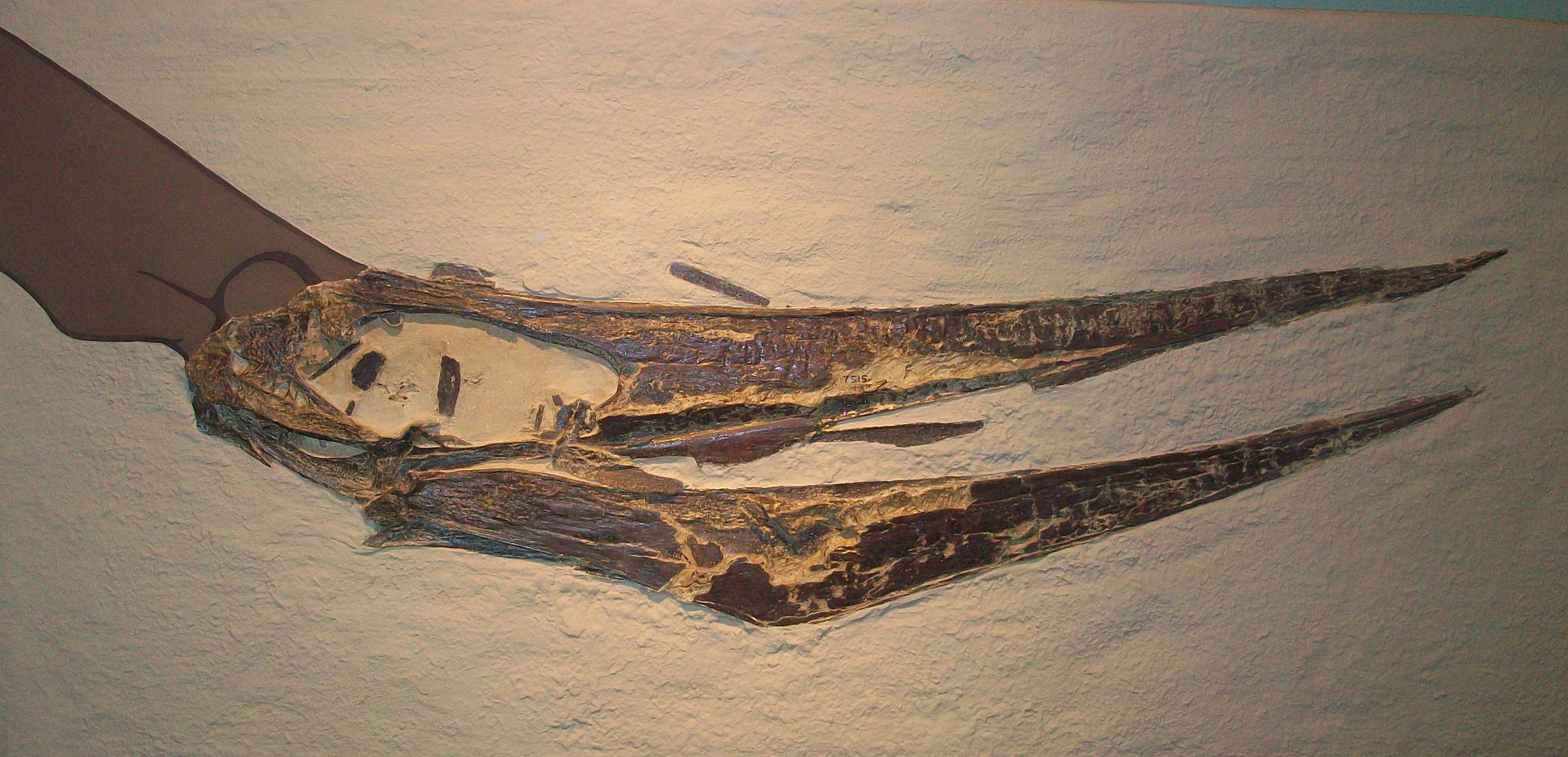
- Skull specimen (AMNH 7515) of the pteranodontid Pteranodon longiceps
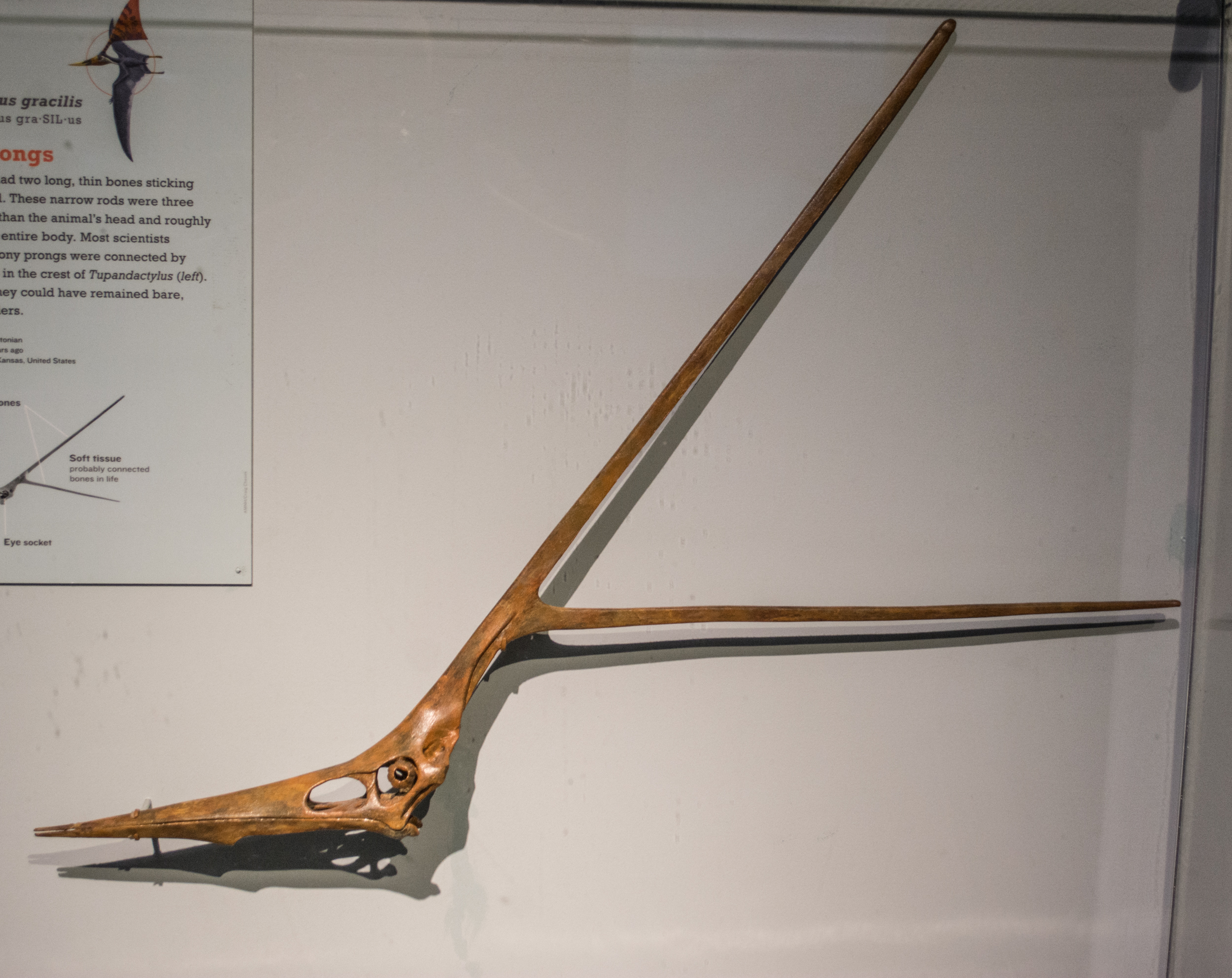
- Skull cast of the nyctosaurid Nyctosaurus gracilis

Scientific classification
- Kingdom: Animalia
- Phylum: Chordata
- Class: Reptilia
- Order: †Pterosauria
- Suborder: †Pterodactyloidea
- Clade: †Pteranodontoidea
- Clade: †Pteranodontia; Marsh, 1887

Subgroups
- †Pteranodontidae; †Nyctosauromorpha; †Alamodactylus; †Cretornis; †Aponyctosauria; †Alcione; †Epapatelo; †Simurghia; †Nyctosauridae

= Pteranodontia =

Pteranodontians Temporal range: Turonian–Maastrichtian

Clade of pteranodontoid pterosaurs

Pteranodontia is an extinct group of ornithocheiroid pterodactyloid pterosaurs. It lived during the Late Cretaceous (Turonian to Maastrichtian stages) of North America, South America, Europe and Africa. They were some of the most advanced pterosaurs, and possessed highly specialized cranial crests that may have served as sexual attraction, with males having a much larger crest.

== Classification ==
Pteranodontia was originally named by Marsh in 1876. In 2003, it was given a phylogenetic definition by David Unwin as the common ancestor of Pteranodon and Nyctosaurus plus all its descendants. Though Marsh had originally named this group based on the shared absence of teeth in those species, most analyses show that all of the traditional "ornithocheiroid" pterosaurs are also members of this clade.

Below is a cladogram showing the phylogenetic placement of this group from Andres and Myers (2013).

- Pteranodontia
  - Nyctosauridae
    - Muzquizopteryx coahuilensis
    - "Nyctosaurus" lamegoi
    - Nyctosaurus gracilis
  - - Alamodactylus byrdi
    - Pteranodontoidea
      - - Pteranodon longiceps
        - Pteranodon sternbergi
      - - Istiodactylidae
          - Longchengpterus zhaoi
          - - Nurhachius ignaciobritoi
            - - Liaoxipterus brachyognathus
              - - Istiodactylus latidens
                - Istiodactylus sinensis
        - - Lonchodectes compressirostris
          - - Aetodactylus halli
            - - Cearadactylus atrox
              - - Brasileodactylus araripensis
                - - Ludodactylus sibbicki
                  - Ornithocheirae
                    - Anhangueridae
                      - Liaoningopterus gui
                      - - Anhanguera araripensis
                        - - Anhanguera blittersdorffi
                          - - Anhanguera piscator
                            - Anhanguera santanae
                    - Ornithocheiridae
                      - Tropeognathus mesembrinus
                      - - Ornithocheirus simus
                        - - Coloborhynchus clavirostris
                          - Coloborhynchus wadleighi

In 2018, Longrich, Martill, and Andres revisited the classification and proposed a different hypothesis based on a new phylogenetic analysis. Following Marsh's original classification, they restricted Pteranodontia to the families Pteranodontidae and Nyctosauridae. They also replaced Pteranodontia with Pteranodontoidea as the more inclusive group.

- Ornithocheiroidea
  - Azhdarchoidea
    - Tapejaromorpha
    - Neoazhdarchia
      - Dsungaripteromorpha
        - Dsungaripteridae
        - Thalassodromidae
      - Neopterodactyloidea
        - Azhdarchidae
        - Chaoyangopteridae
  - - Piksi barbarulna
    - Pteranodontoidea
      - Ornithocheiromorpha
      - Pteranodontia
        - Pteranodontidae
          - - Pteranodon sternbergi
            - Pteranodon longiceps
          - Tethydraco regalis
        - Nyctosauridae
          - Alamodactylus byrdi
          - Volgadraco bogolubovi
          - - Cretornis hlavaci
            - - - Alcione elainus
                - Simurghia robusta
              - - Muzquizopteryx coahuilensis
                - - - Barbaridactylus grandis
                    - Nyctosaurus lamegoi
                  - - Nyctosaurus nanus
                    - Nyctosaurus gracilis

In 2022, Fernandes et al. described Epapatelo as a new pteranodontian from Angola. Including Epapatelo in the phylogenetic analysis of Longrich et al. (2018), they recovered a new clade, Aponyctosauria, composed of the Nyctosauridae, Alcione, Simurghia, and Epapatelo.

- Pteranodontia
  - - Tethydraco
    - - Pteranodon longiceps
      - Pteranodon sternbergi (Geosternbergia)
  - - Alamodactylus
    - Volgadraco
    - - Cretornis
      - Aponyctosauria
        - - Epapatelo
          - Simurghia
          - Alcione
        - Nyctosauridae
          - Muzquizopteryx
          - - - Nyctosaurus lamegoi
              - Nyctosaurus grandis (Barbaridactylus)
            - - Nyctosaurus nanus
              - Nyctosaurus gracilis

== Paleobiology ==
=== Locomotion ===
Similar to other pterosaurs, pteranodontian are considered to have been skilled fliers as well as adept at moving on the ground. Evidence from footprints shows that most pterosaurs did not sprawl their limbs to a large degree, as in modern reptiles, but rather held the limbs relatively erect when walking, like dinosaurs. Footprints of pteranodontians are still unknown, but it is likely that they also walked erect. Among pterosaurs, pteranodontians had unusually uneven limb proportions, with the forelimbs much larger and longer than the hind limbs. This would likely have required them to use unique modes of locomotion when on the ground compared to other pterosaurs. Most pteranodontians like Pteranodon flew like modern day albatrosses, which consists of flying very long distances and rarely flapping, though they were thermal soarers like continental flyers rather than dynamic soarers like most seabirds.
