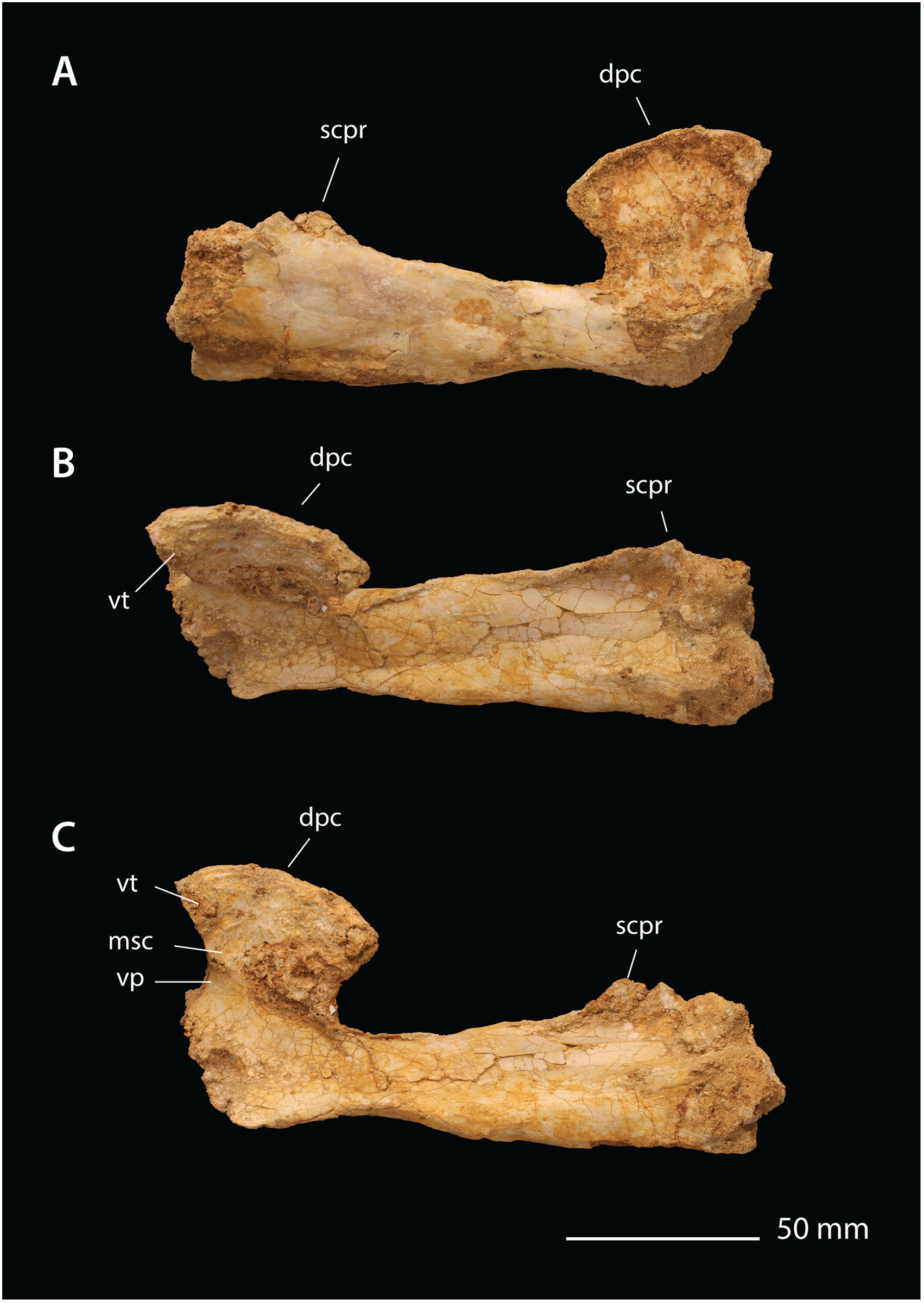
- Holotype humerus

Scientific classification
- Kingdom: Animalia
- Phylum: Chordata
- Class: Reptilia
- Order: †Pterosauria
- Suborder: †Pterodactyloidea
- Clade: †Pteranodontoidea
- Clade: †Pteranodontia
- Clade: †Aponyctosauria
- Genus: †Simurghia; Longrich et al., 2018

Type species
- †Simurghia robusta Longrich et al., 2018

Species
- †S. robusta Longrich et al., 2018; †S. lamegoi? (Price, 1953)

Synonyms
- "Nyctosaurus" lamegoi? (Price, 1953)

= Simurghia =

Simurghia Temporal range: Late Cretaceous, Maastrichtian

Genus of pterosaur from the Late Cretaceous

Simurghia is a genus of pterosaur from the Ouled Abdoun Basin of Morocco, a basin that dates to the Maastrichtian stage of the Late Cretaceous period, about 66 million years ago. It was published in 2018 by paleontologists Nicholas R. Longrich, David M. Martill, and Brian Andres, along with two other pterosaurs from the same basin: Alcione and Barbaridactylus. The type species is S. robusta. A possible second species, S. ("Nyctosaurus") lamegoi, is known from the Campanian-Maastrichtian age strata of Brazil.

== Discovery and naming ==
All known specimens of Simurghia were uncovered in a 3-year dig that unearthed about 200 pterosaur specimens. The type specimen, FSAC-OB 7, consists of a nearly complete humerus, lacking only the humeral head and the ulnar crest.

Simurghia is named after a flying beast from Persian mythology known as the Simurgh. The species name, S. robusta, is a Latin word that means "robust."

In 2024, "Nyctosaurus" lamegoi was assigned as a species of Simurghia.

== Classification ==
Size of Simurghia (top middle) compared to other pterosaurs, birds, and a human

Below is a cladogram showing the results of a phylogenetic analysis first presented by Andres and colleagues in 2014, and updated with additional data by Longrich and colleagues in 2018. In this analysis, they found Simurghia to be the sister taxon of the species Alcione elainus, both placed within the family Nyctosauridae.

- Pteranodontia
  - - Pteranodontidae
      - - Pteranodon sternbergi
        - Pteranodon longiceps
      - Tethydraco regalis
  - Nyctosauridae
    - Alamodactylus byrdi
    - Volgadraco bogolubovi
    - - Cretornis hlavaci
      - - - Alcione elainus
          - Simurghia robusta
        - - Muzquizopteryx coahuilensis
          - - - Barbaridactylus grandis
              - Nyctosaurus lamegoi
            - - Nyctosaurus nanus
              - Nyctosaurus gracilis

In their phylogenetic analyses, Fernandes et al. (2022) recovered Simurghia as the sister taxon to Epapatelo and Alcione. These taxa, along with the Nyctosauridae, comprise the clade Aponyctosauria.

- Pteranodontia
  - - Tethydraco
    - - Pteranodon longiceps
      - Pteranodon sternbergi (Geosternbergia)
  - - Alamodactylus
    - Volgadraco
    - - Cretornis
      - Aponyctosauria
        - - Epapatelo
          - Simurghia
          - Alcione
        - Nyctosauridae
          - Muzquizopteryx
          - - - Nyctosaurus lamegoi
              - Nyctosaurus grandis (Barbaridactylus)
            - - Nyctosaurus nanus
              - Nyctosaurus gracilis

== Paleobiology ==
Simurghia is similar in form to Alcione, but is unlikely to represent an adult of this species. All specimens of Alcione are either subadults or adults, based on their bone's dense avascular surface texture, well ossified condyles, and fused synsacrum and scapulocoracoid. Additionally, lack of intermediately sized humeri would suggest that these pterosaurs are distinct from each other. Using isometric scaling, Simurghia would weigh 560% more than Alcione, making sexual dimorphism or intraspecific variation unlikely. It is estimated to have a wingspan of 5 m (16 ft).

== Paleoecology ==
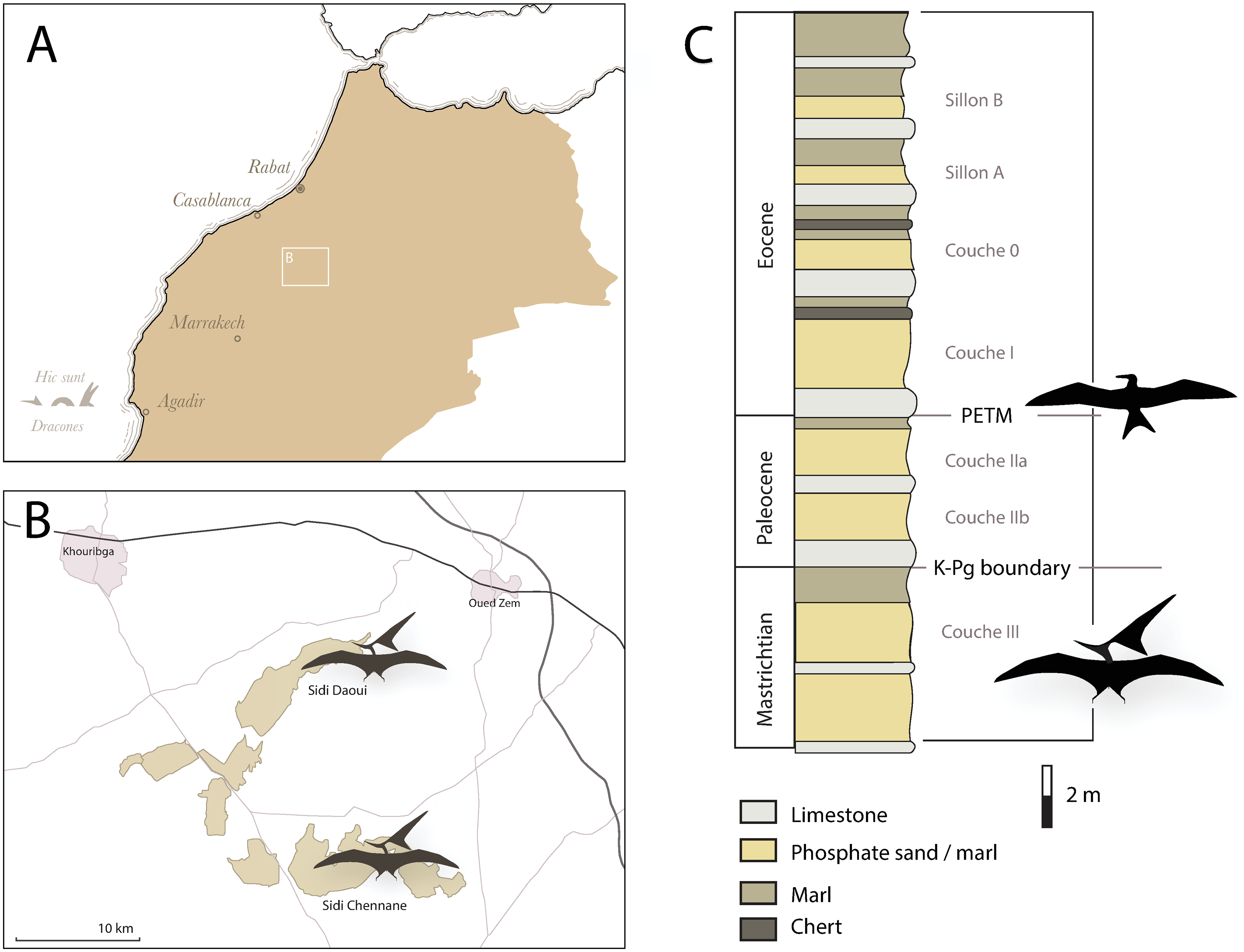
Locality and stratigraphy of the discovery site of Simurghia.

Simurghia was discovered in upper Maastrichtian phosphates located in the Ouled Abdoun Basin of Northern Morocco. This geological formation does not belong to a formation. It is divided into couches, with Simurghia being discovered in Couche III. This layer dates back to the latest Maastrichtian, about 1 million years before the extinction event at the end of the Cretaceous. Couche III represents the most diverse marine ecosystem known from the time.

A large variety of marine life is known from the region, including sharks and bony fish, in addition to turtles, plesiosaurs and mosasaurs. A few rare, fragmentary dinosaur fossils are known, including an abelisaur and a sauropod. Other pterosaurs in the formation were originally only represented by the azhdarchid Phosphatodraco mauritanicus. However, in addition to Simurghia, more recent studies have revealed at least five more pterosaur species from this location, including Barbaridactylus, Alcione and Tethydraco.
