= Volgadraco =

Volgadraco Temporal range: Late Cretaceous, Campanian

Scientific classification
- Kingdom: Animalia
- Phylum: Chordata
- Class: Reptilia
- Order: †Pterosauria
- Suborder: †Pterodactyloidea
- Clade: †Azhdarchoidea
- Family: †Azhdarchidae
- Genus: †Volgadraco; Averianov et al., 2008

Type species
- †Volgadraco bogolubovi Averianov et al., 2008

Genus of ornithocheiroid pterosaur from the Late Cretaceous

Volgadraco ("Volga River dragon") is a genus of pterosaur from the Upper Cretaceous of European Russia.

== Discovery and naming ==
Volgadraco was named based on a lower beak (the holotype, SGU, no. 46/104a) and postcranial fragments from the early Campanian-age Rybushka Formation of Saratov, Russia. The size of this animal, and the development of blood supply in the lower jaw are intermediate between older Santonian or Turonian azhdarchids like Azhdarcho and Bakonydraco and later Maastrichtian azhdarchids like Quetzalcoatlus. Volgadraco was described in 2008 by Averianov, Arkhangelsky, and Pervushov. The type species is V. bogolubovi, the specific name honouring Russian paleontologist Nikolai Nikolaevich Bogolubov.

== Classification ==
Averianov and colleagues initially assigned Volgadraco to the family Azhdarchidae, and considered the earlier named genus Bogolubovia to be a nomen dubium that is potentially identical to Volgadraco. In contrast, Longrich and colleagues in 2018 had recovered it within the family Nyctosauridae, the cladogram of which can be seen below:

- Pteranodontoidea
  - Ornithocheiromorpha
  - Pteranodontia
    - - Pteranodontidae
        - - Pteranodon sternbergi
          - Pteranodon longiceps
        - Tethydraco regalis
    - Nyctosauridae
      - Alamodactylus byrdi
      - Volgadraco bogolubovi
      - - Cretornis hlavaci
        - - - Alcione elainus
            - Simurghia robusta
          - - Muzquizopteryx coahuilensis
            - - - Barbaridactylus grandis
                - Nyctosaurus lamegoi
              - - Nyctosaurus nanus
                - Nyctosaurus gracilis

In 2020, Averianov and Arkhangelsky reconsidered both Bogolubovia and Volgadraco as members of the family Pteranodontidae. In 2022, Averianov and Kurin considered both Volgadraco and Bogolubovia as valid pteranodontids based on a new specimen of Bogolubovia. In the same year, however, Volgadraco was considered to be a pteranodontian both outside the Nyctosauridae and Pteranodontidae based on phylogenetic analysis, the cladogram of which can be seen below:

- Pteranodontia
  - - Tethydraco
    - - Pteranodon longiceps
      - Pteranodon sternbergi (Geosternbergia)
  - - Alamodactylus
    - Volgadraco
    - - Cretornis
      - Aponyctosauria
        - - Epapatelo
          - Simurghia
          - Alcione
        - Nyctosauridae
          - Muzquizopteryx
          - - - Nyctosaurus lamegoi
              - Nyctosaurus grandis (Barbaridactylus)
            - - Nyctosaurus nanus
              - Nyctosaurus gracilis

In 2026, Averianov and Arkhangelsky regarded the hypodigm of Volgadraco as comprising fossils of different types of pterosaurs. The holotype rostrum was retained as an azhdarchid based on the lack of curvature seen in Pteranodon, while the referred cervical vertebrae were regarded as belonging to an indeterminate Pteranodon.

== See also ==
- Timeline of pterosaur research
- List of pterosaurs
