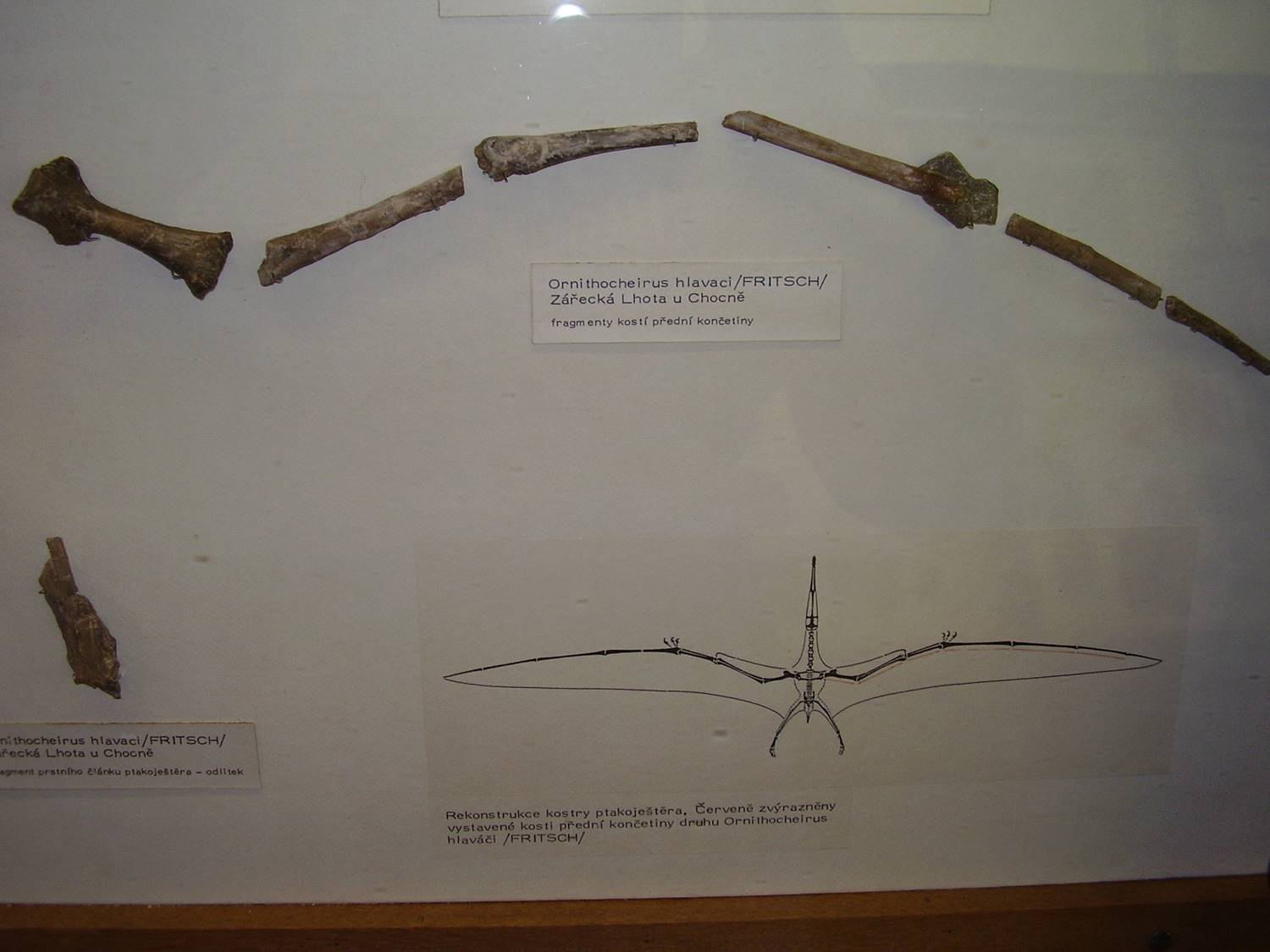
- Partial wing of Cretornis hlavaci

Scientific classification
- Kingdom: Animalia
- Phylum: Chordata
- Class: Reptilia
- Order: †Pterosauria
- Suborder: †Pterodactyloidea
- Clade: †Pteranodontoidea
- Clade: †Nyctosauromorpha
- Genus: †Cretornis; Frič, 1881

Type species
- †Cretornis hlavaci Frič, 1881

Synonyms
- Ornithocheirus hlavaci (Fritsch, 1881)

= Cretornis =

Cretornis Temporal range: Late Cretaceous, 92 Ma

Genus of ornithocheiroid pterosaur from the Late Cretaceous

Cretornis is a pterosaur genus from the late Cretaceous period (Turonian stage) of what is now the Jizera Formation in the Czech Republic, dating to about 92 million years ago. It only contains a single species, Cretornis hlavaci.

== Discovery and naming ==
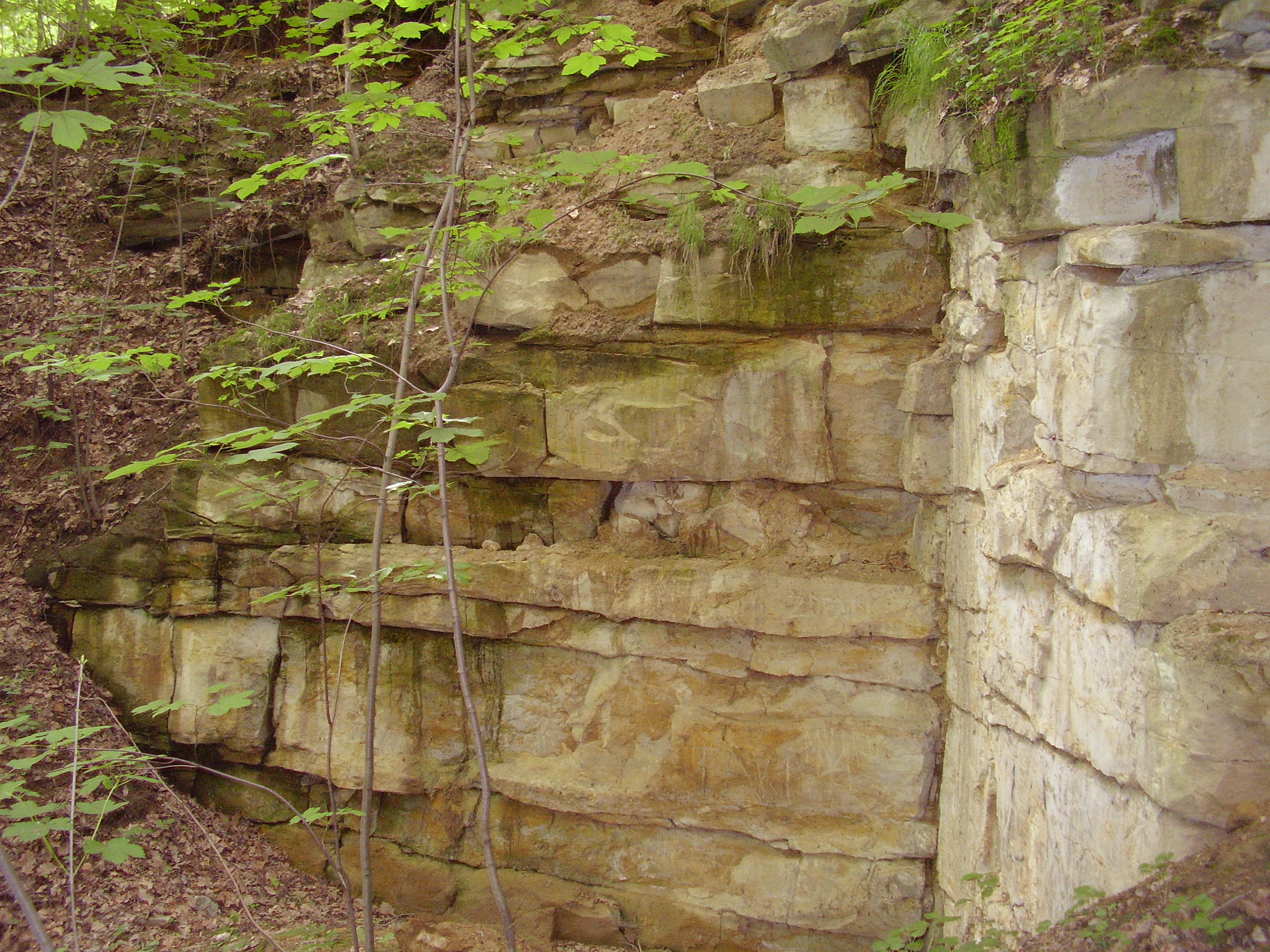
Former sandstone quarry, location of discovery of C. hlavaci in 1880.

The fossils were discovered in 1880 by workers at a sandstone quarry in Zářecká Lhota near the town of Choceň, who were getting gravel to repair a local road. A certain Mrs. Tomková, a croupier from Choceň, then alerted František Hlaváč, a Choceň pharmacist and fossil collector, to the find. He recognised exceptionality of that one, secured the rest of the fossils and then sent them to naturalist Professor Antonín Frič in Prague. In 1881, Frič identified it as a prehistoric toothed bird the size of a recent swan and named it as the type species Cretornis Hlaváči. The generic name is derived from Latin creta, "chalk", in reference to the Cretaceous, and Greek ὄρνις, ornis, "bird", as Frič originally thought that the fossil bones belonged to some kind of ancient toothed bird (similar to the genus Ichthyornis). The specific name honors Hlaváč.

Today, the holotype fossils of this pterosaur are stored in the National Museum in Prague. There is also unconfirmed information that similar bones (perhaps also pterosaur bones) were found in other places around the quarry before and during this discovery, but later they were apparently lost.

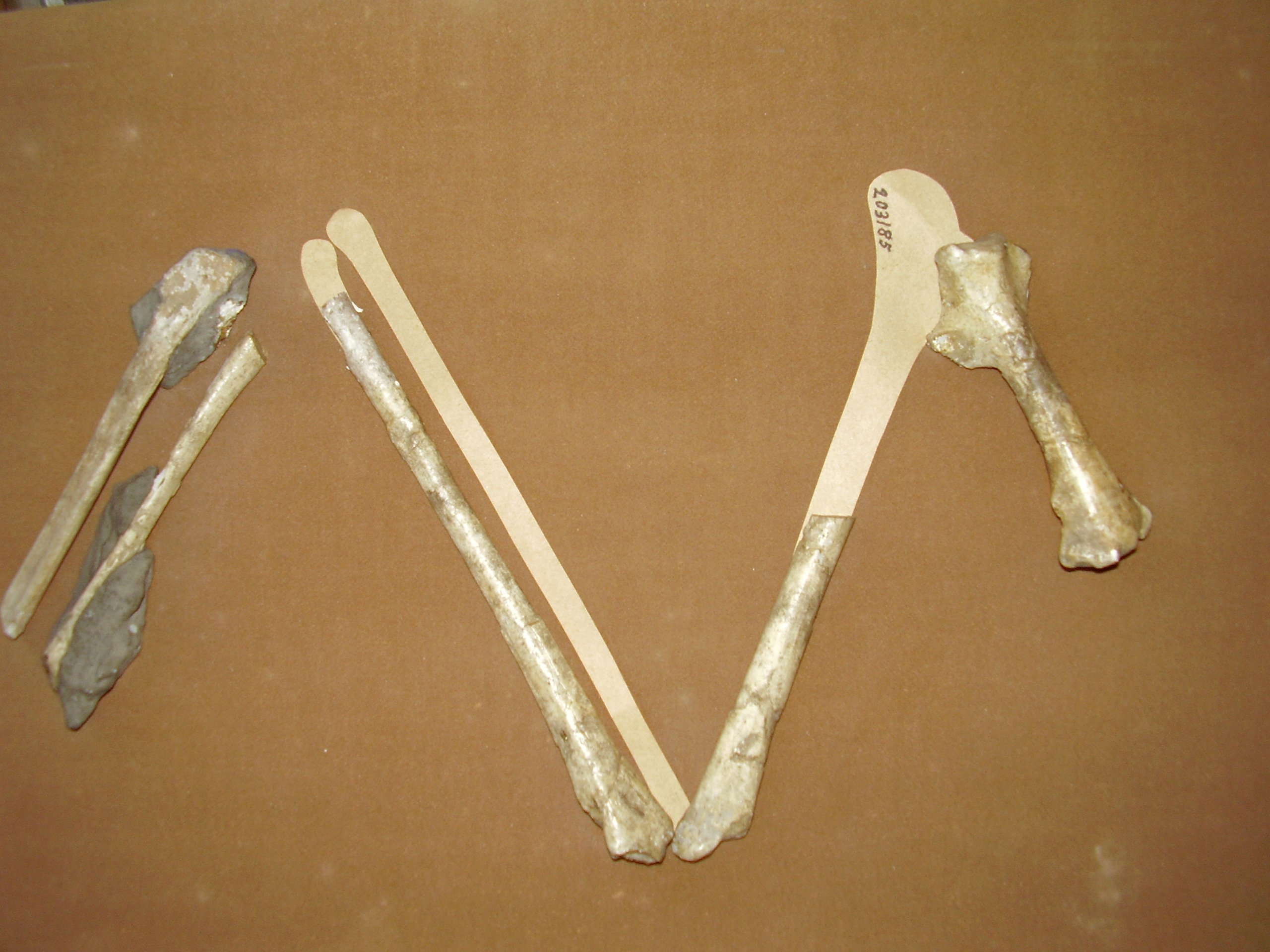
Old restoration of the fossil wing of Cretornis hlavaci (Choceň Museum)

Afterwards it was realized that the find represented some pterosaur. The name was incorrectly emended by Richard Lydekker into Ornithochirus hlavatschi Fritsch 1881, in 1888. As scientific species names are not allowed to contain diacritical signs, the specific name had to be transcribed. Lydekker chose to write it as if it, and Frič himself, were German, as Bohemia at the time was under a strong German cultural influence. Frič, an ethnic Czech, in 1905 ultimately used the correct transcription Ornithocheirus hlavaci.

Since 1905, the taxon was typically considered a nomen dubium. In 2010 however, Russian paleontologist Alexandr Averianov concluded that it should be possible to determine unique traits. In 2015 he and Czech paleontologist Boris Ekrt published a new description, concluding that Cretornis was a valid taxon.

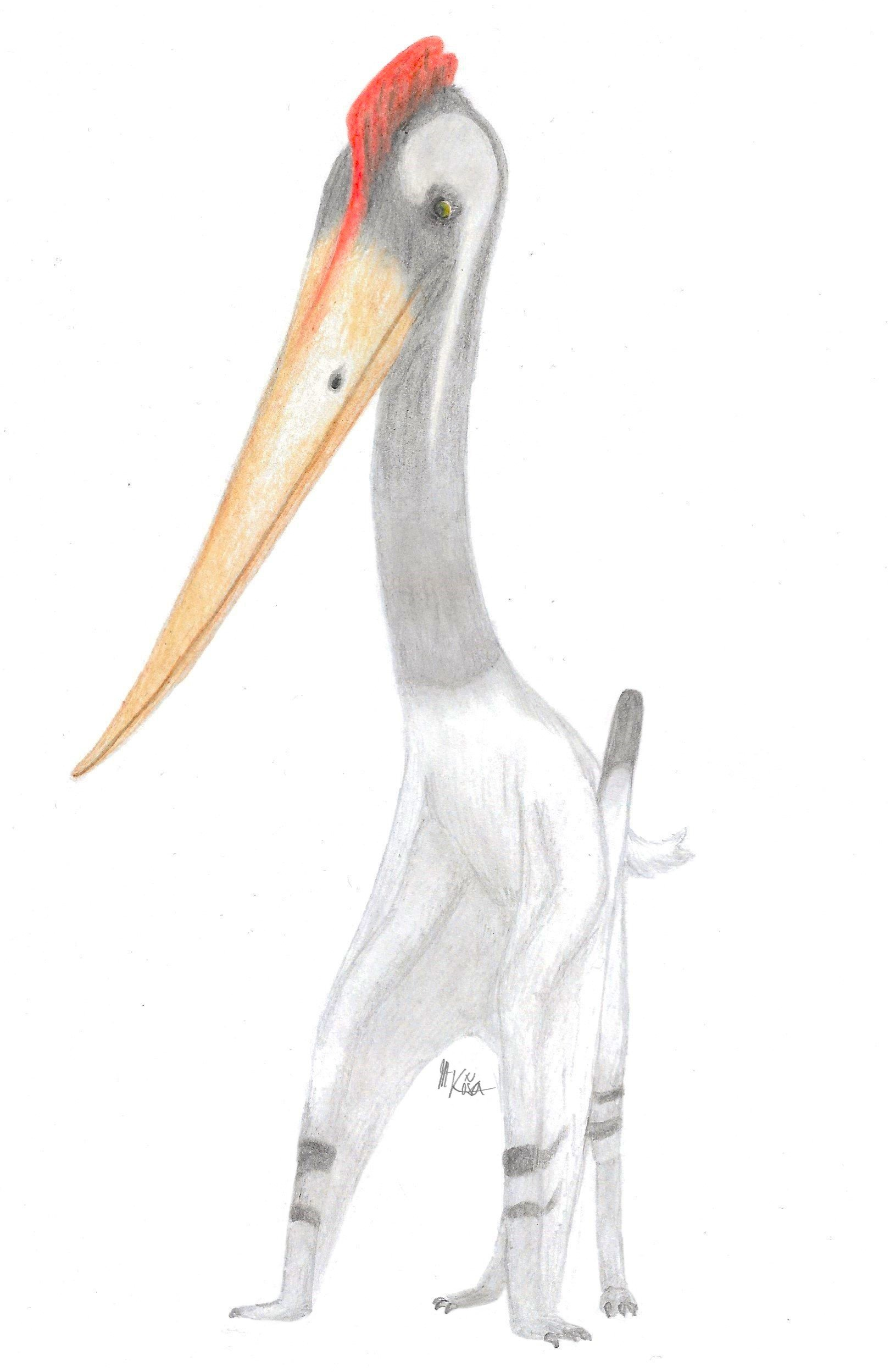
Life restoration

Cretornis is known from the holotype, presently preserved in the collection of the Národní muzeum (National Museum) in Prague as "Object 10". It was found in what Frič called the Mittlere Iserschichten, today known as the Jizera Formation, dating from the Turonian. It is a partial skeleton lacking the skull. It contains a complete humerus (upper arm bone), an ulna, radius, wrist and two phalanges of the wing finger.

== Description ==
Based on comparison with its relatives, the wingspan of C. hlavaci has by Averianov been estimated at 1.5 to 1.6 meters (4.9 to 5.2 ft). The humerus is 76 millimeters (3 in) in length.

In 2015, Averianov indicated a single autapomorphy, unique derived trait: the distal part of the humerus has a diamond-shaped cross-section.

== Classification ==
Cretornis was classified as a species in the genus Ornithocheirus in the nineteenth century. In 1997 Coralia-Maria Jianu suggested it belonged to the Pteranodontidae. In 2010, Averianov thought is it was a member of the Azhdarchidae. More detailed comparisons of the wing bones led Averianov to conclude in 2015 that they belonged to a non-azhdarchid azhdarchoid, probably a member of the group Neoazhdarchia with which it has many features in common. It is probably more advanced than the Thalassodromidae, and shares with Montanazhdarcho the trait that the distal part of the ulna has a joint surface that is placed more proximal than the tubercle. In 2018, paleontologist Nicholas Longrich and colleagues had recovered Cretornis within the family Nyctosauridae, in a more derived position than Alamodactylus and Volgadraco, this contradicts its position within the Azhdarchoidea. The cladogram of their analysis is shown below:

- Pteranodontoidea
  - Ornithocheiromorpha
  - Pteranodontia
    - - Pteranodontidae
        - - Pteranodon sternbergi
          - Pteranodon longiceps
        - Tethydraco regalis
    - Nyctosauridae
      - Alamodactylus byrdi
      - Volgadraco bogolubovi
      - - Cretornis hlavaci
        - - - Alcione elainus
            - Simurghia robusta
          - - Muzquizopteryx coahuilensis
            - - - Barbaridactylus grandis
                - Nyctosaurus lamegoi
              - - Nyctosaurus nanus
                - Nyctosaurus gracilis

However, subsequent phylogenetic analyses placed Cretornis as a pteranodontian outside Nyctosauridae.

== See also ==
- List of pterosaur genera
- Timeline of pterosaur research
