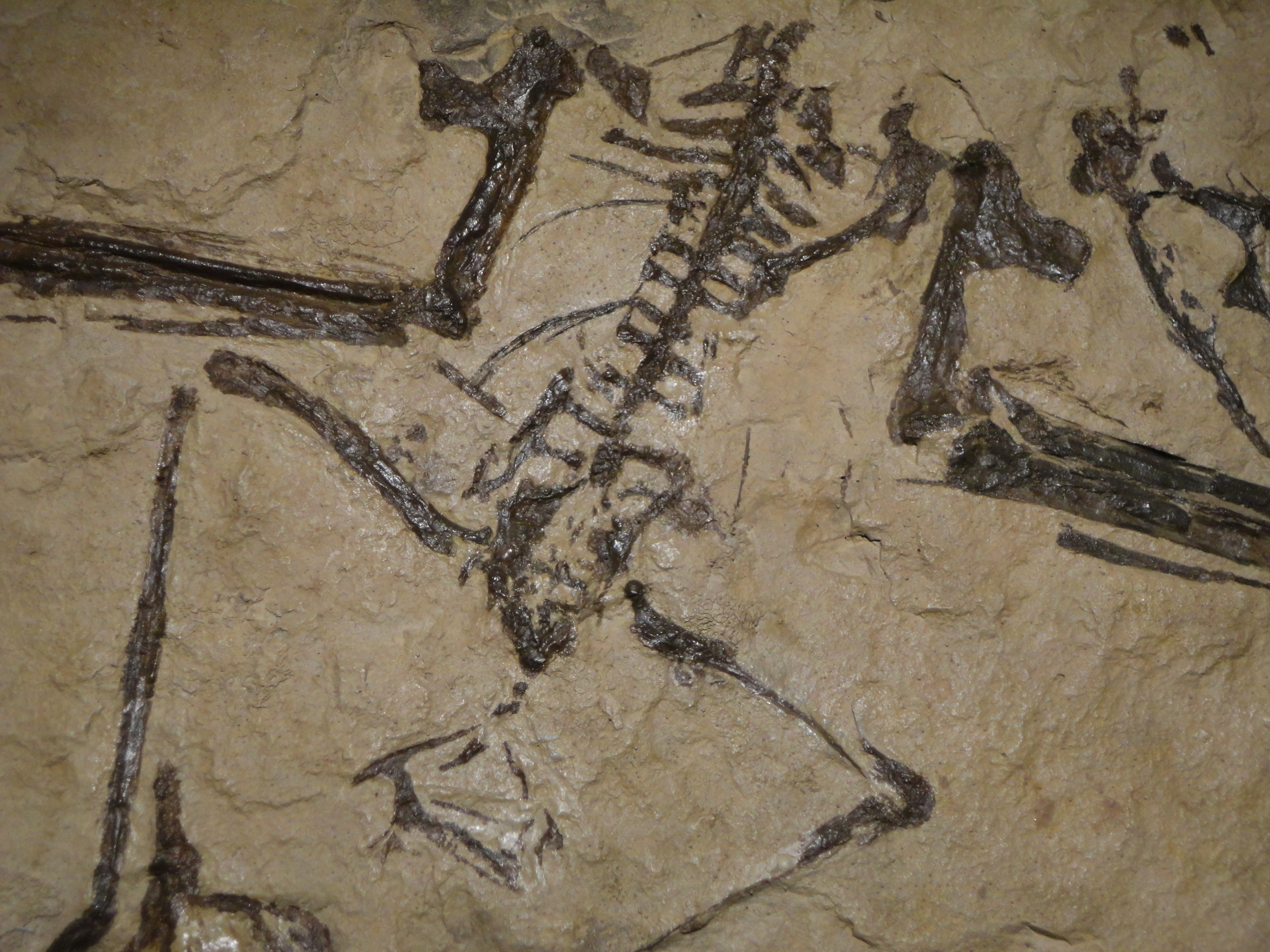
- Fossil skeleton

Scientific classification
- Kingdom: Animalia
- Phylum: Chordata
- Class: Reptilia
- Order: †Pterosauria
- Suborder: †Pterodactyloidea
- Clade: †Pteranodontoidea
- Clade: †Aponyctosauria
- Family: †Nyctosauridae
- Genus: †Muzquizopteryx; Frey et al., 2006

Type species
- †Muzquizopteryx coahuilensis Frey et al., 2006

= Muzquizopteryx =

Muzquizopteryx Temporal range: Coniacian

Genus of nyctosaurid pterosaur from the Late Cretaceous

Muzquizopteryx is a genus of nyctosaurid pterodactyloid pterosaur from the Late Cretaceous period (early Coniacian stage) of what is now Coahuila, Mexico.

== Discovery and naming ==
In the 1990s, José Martínez Vásquez, a worker at the chalk quarry of El Rosario, uncovered a skeleton of a pterosaur. This he handed to a quarry official, who had it bricked in on the face of an office wall as a decorative piece. After its unique scientific value had been recognized in 2002, the specimen was acquired by the Universidad Nacional Autónoma de México. Subsequently, it was studied by a combined team of the University of Karlsruhe and the Desert Museum and scientifically reported in 2004.

In 2006, the type species Muzquizopteryx coahuilensis was named and described by Eberhard Frey, Marie-Céline Buchy, Wolfgang Stinnesbeck, Arturo González-González and Alfredo di Stefano. The generic name is derived from the Múzquiz district and a Greek πτέρυξ, pteryx, "wing". The specific name is derived from the state of Coahuila.

Muzquizopteryx is based on holotype UNAM IGM 8621, found in the El Rosario layers, early Coniacian-aged rocks. It consists of a nearly complete, articulated skeleton that includes soft tissue remains, among them long fossilised tendons along both sides of both lower arms. The specimen represents an adult individual.

In 2012, a second specimen was reported, MUDE CPC-494, again uncovered by a quarry worker, perhaps at the same site, and sold to a private collector. It was later acquired by the Museo del Desierto Saltillo. It consists of the right upper wing of a subadult individual, with about 81% of the length of the holotype. As its provenance probably consists of slightly older layers from the late Turonian and the remains are limited, it was referred to as cf. Muzquizopteryx sp.

== Description ==
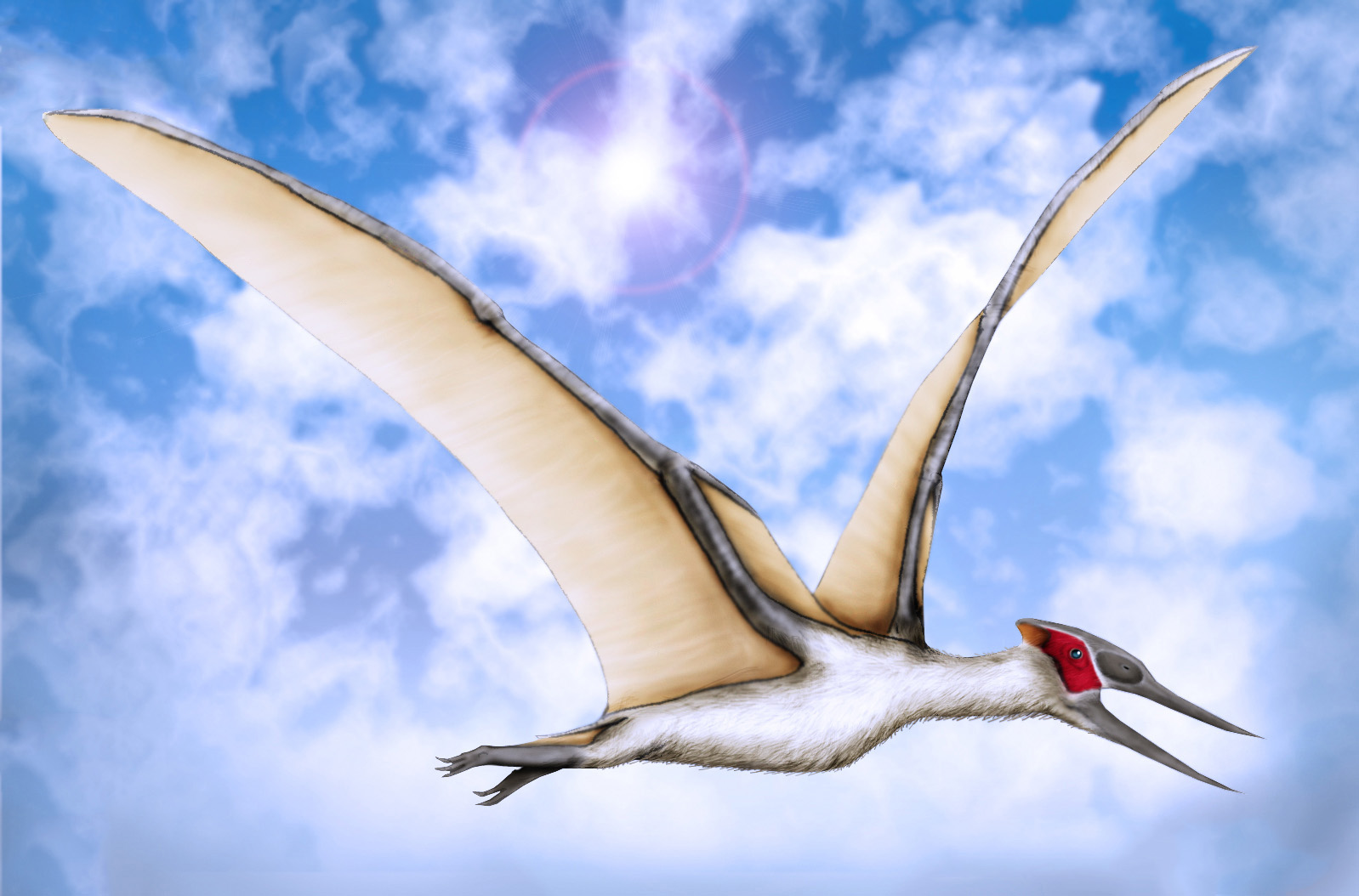
Life restoration

Muzquizopteryx was relatively small for a pterodactyloid pterosaur, with a wingspan of around 2 meters (6.6 ft). It had an elongated head with a convex upper profile, ending at the back of the head in a backward pointing short rounded crest. The jaws were toothless. The arms were very robust with the humerus featuring a large hatchet-shaped deltopectoral crest, indicating a strong wing musculature. The pteroid bone was long and pointed towards the neck, supporting a flight membrane.

== Classification ==
Muzquizopteryx was by its describers assigned to the Nyctosauridae. It would then be the oldest known member of the group and the smallest known; indeed the smallest adult Late Cretaceous pterosaur discovered until 2006. As Nyctosaurus is sometimes included with the Pteranodontidae, Muzquizopteryx too might be considered a member of that group under some classifications.

Below is a cladogram showing the results of a phylogenetic analysis first presented by Andres and colleagues in 2014, and updated with additional data by Longrich and colleagues in 2018. They found Muzquizopteryx within the family Nyctosauridae.

- Ornithocheiroidea
  - Azhdarchoidea
  - - Piksi barbarulna
    - Pteranodontoidea
      - Ornithocheiromorpha
      - Pteranodontia
        - - Pteranodontidae
            - - Pteranodon sternbergi
              - Pteranodon longiceps
            - Tethydraco regalis
        - Nyctosauridae
          - Alamodactylus byrdi
          - Volgadraco bogolubovi
          - - Cretornis hlavaci
            - - - Alcione elainus
                - Simurghia robusta
              - - Muzquizopteryx coahuilensis
                - - - Barbaridactylus grandis
                    - Nyctosaurus lamegoi
                  - - Nyctosaurus nanus
                    - Nyctosaurus gracilis

== See also ==
- List of pterosaur genera
- Timeline of pterosaur research
