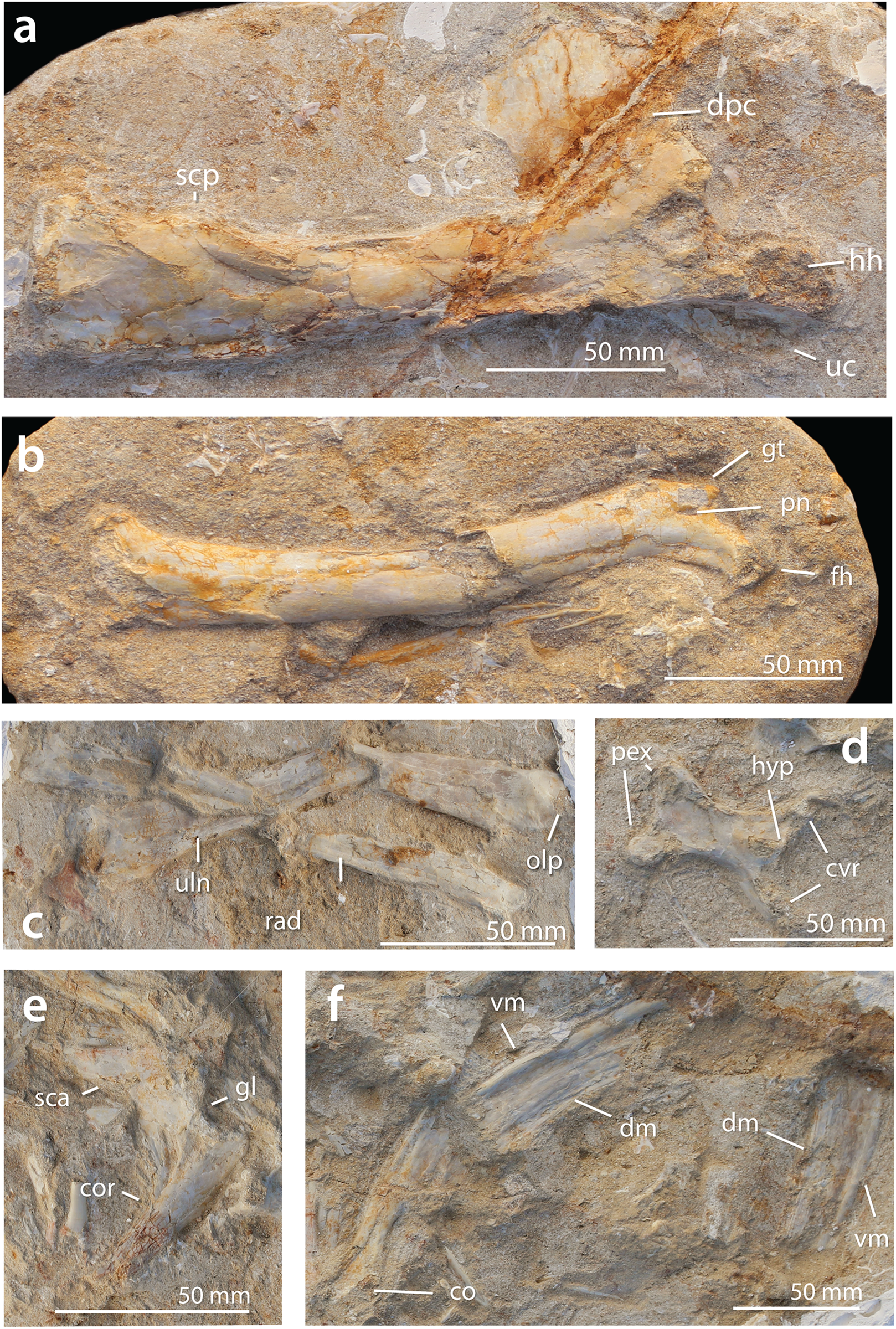
- Holotype

Scientific classification
- Kingdom: Animalia
- Phylum: Chordata
- Class: Reptilia
- Order: †Pterosauria
- Suborder: †Pterodactyloidea
- Clade: †Pteranodontoidea
- Clade: †Aponyctosauria
- Family: †Nyctosauridae
- Genus: †Barbaridactylus; Longrich et al., 2018

Type species
- †Barbaridactylus grandis Longrich et al., 2018

Synonyms
- Nyctosaurus grandis? Andres, 2021

= Barbaridactylus =

Barbaridactylus Temporal range: Late Cretaceous, 66 Ma

Genus of nyctosaurid pterosaur from the Late Cretaceous

Barbaridactylus is a nyctosaurid pterosaur from the Ouled Abdoun Basin of Morocco, a basin that dates back to the Maastrichtian stage of the Late Cretaceous. It was published in 2018 by paleontologists Nicholas R. Longrich, David M. Martill, and Brian Andres. In the same publication, two other pterosaurs from the same basin were described: Alcione and Simurghia. The type and only species is B. grandis.

== Discovery and naming ==
All known specimens of Barbaridactylus were uncovered in a 3-year dig that unearthed about 200 pterosaur specimens. Its type specimen is FSAC-OB 232, which consists of its right femur, left radius, ulna, humerus, and scapulocoracoid, and partial mandible. Four other specimens have been referred to Barbaridactylus, FSAC-OB 8, 9, 10, and 11. They are all humeri.

According to Longrich, Martill and Andres, Barbaridactylus is named after the Barbary Coast of North Africa, and the Greek dactylo, meaning "finger". However, the proper word for "finger" in Ancient Greek is daktylos (δάκτυλος). Its specific name, grandis means "great" in Latin.

== Description ==
Size of Barbaridactylus (top, third highest) compared to other pterosaurs, birds, and a human

Barbaridactylus was one of the larger nyctosaurids, with a humerus length of 22.5 cm (8.9 in), wingspan of approximately 4 m (13 ft) and a body mass of 4 kg (8.8 lb), making it one of the largest nyctosaurids. (Note: Paul's estimate of the wingspan and body mass is actually written for Alcione in his book, based on his assumption that Barbaridactylus represents the adult stage of Alcione. However, the 2018 study directly refutes this claim based on the hatchet-shaped deltopectoral crest different from Alcione; the wingspan of approximately 4 m (13 ft) is noted in the supplement of this study which concurs with Paul's estimate.) Like other nyctosaurids, Barbaridactylus had upward-curving jaws. The only known cervical is also rather typical for nyctosaurids, as it is proportionately short and broad, a morphology also present in the related pteranodontids. The scapulocoracoid is fused, meaning that the animal was probably an adult. It is boomerang shaped, and the two bones (the scapula and coracoid) form a 60-degree angle. The humeral shaft is long and thin. The hatchet-shaped deltopectoral crest (a distinctive feature of nyctosaurids) is in a notably distal location in relation to the humeral head, more similar to that of Nyctosaurus than Alcione. This crest is short and broad, and the expanded tip is weakly developed, which are basal features. The deltopectoral crest appears warped from an anterior view, more so than in other nyctosaurids, but much less than in pteranodontids. There is a pneumatic fossa located on the ventral surface of each humeral head that is unique to this species. The ulna is relatively gracile, unlike the robust ulna of Alcione, and its ends are weakly expanded. The diameter radius is approximately two thirds that of the ulna. The femur of Barbaridactylus is relatively typical for a nyctosaurid, although it lacks the strong distal expansion present in other nyctosaurids. Instead, it expands more gently, similar to that of Pteranodon.

== Classification ==
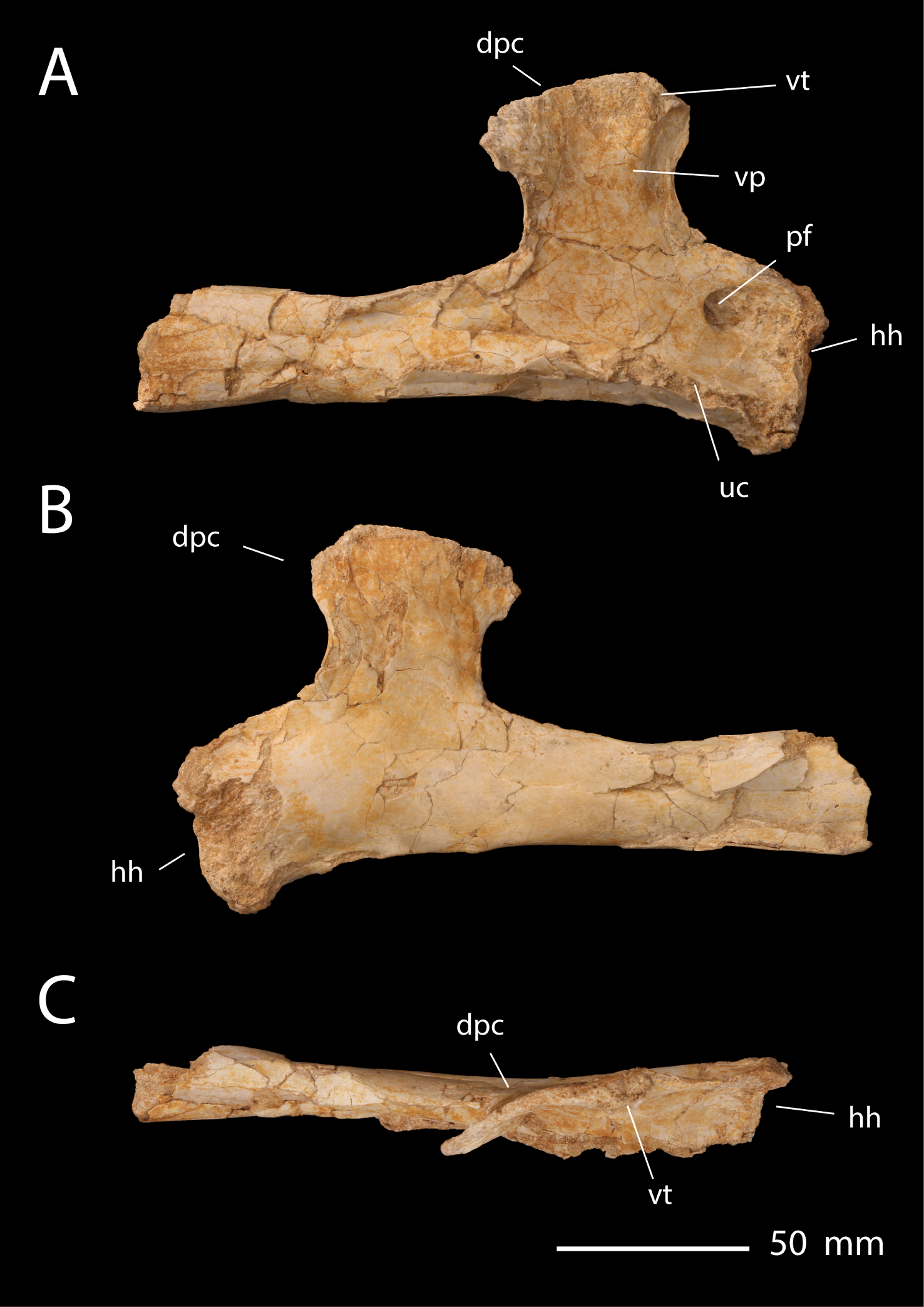
Assigned right humerus

Below is a cladogram showing the results of a phylogenetic analysis first presented by Andres and colleagues in 2014, and updated with additional data by Longrich and colleagues in 2018. In this analysis, they found Barbaridactylus to be the sister taxon of the Nyctosaurus species N. lamegoi, both placed within the family Nyctosauridae.

- Ornithocheiroidea
  - Azhdarchoidea
  - - Piksi barbarulna
    - Pteranodontoidea
      - Ornithocheiromorpha
      - Pteranodontia
        - - Pteranodontidae
            - - Pteranodon sternbergi
              - Pteranodon longiceps
            - Tethydraco regalis
        - Nyctosauridae
          - Alamodactylus byrdi
          - Volgadraco bogolubovi
          - - Cretornis hlavaci
            - - - Alcione elainus
                - Simurghia robusta
              - - Muzquizopteryx coahuilensis
                - - - Barbaridactylus grandis
                    - Nyctosaurus lamegoi
                  - - Nyctosaurus nanus
                    - Nyctosaurus gracilis

As part of a 2022 monograph on Quetzalcoatlus, Brian Andres suggested that Barbaridactylus may represent an additional species of Nyctosaurus.

- Pteranodontia
  - - - Pteranodon longiceps
      - Pteranodon sternbergi (Geosternbergia)
    - Ornithostoma
    - Volgadraco
    - Tethydraco
  - Nyctosauromorpha
    - Alamodactylus
    - - Cretornis
      - - - Alcione
          - Simurghia
        - Nyctosauridae
          - Muzquizopteryx
          - - - Nyctosaurus grandis (Barbaridactylus)
              - Nyctosaurus lamegoi
            - - Nyctosaurus nanus
              - Nyctosaurus gracilis

In a 2024 phylogenetic analysis, Barbaridactylus was recovered as the sister taxon of Muzquiopteryx outside of the genus Nyctosaurus, and "Nyctosaurus" lamegoi was included as a species of Simurghia.

== Paleoecology ==
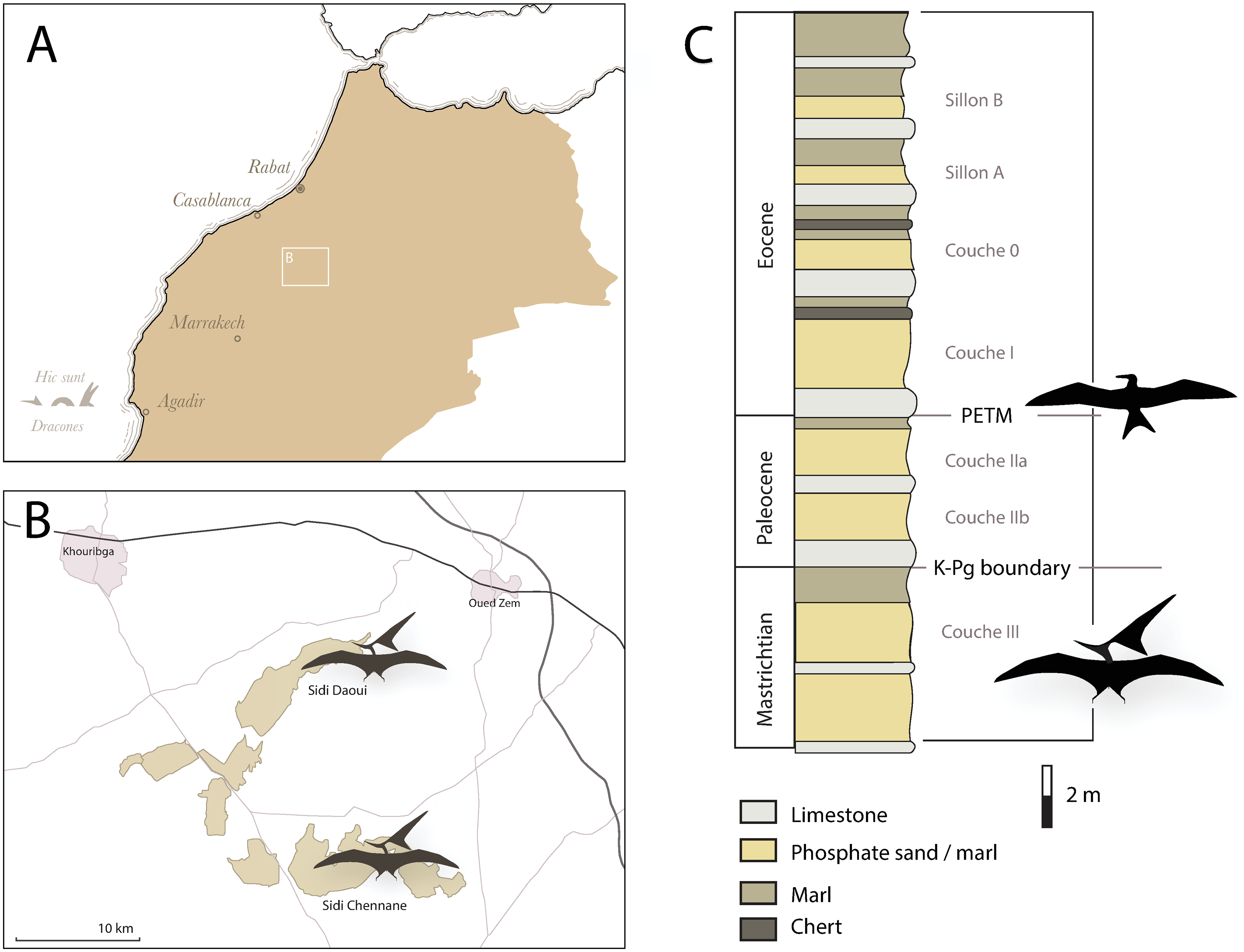
Locality and stratigraphy of the discovery site of Barbaridactylus.

Barbaridactylus was discovered in upper Maastrichtian phosphates located in the Ouled Abdoun Basin of Northern Morocco. These deposits do not belong to a formation. It is divided into couches, with Barbaridactylus being discovered in Couche III. This layer dates back to the latest Maastrichtian, about 1 million years before the extinction event at the end of the Cretaceous. Couche III represents the most diverse marine ecosystem known from the time.

A large variety of marine life is known from the region, including sharks and bony fish, in addition to turtles, plesiosaurs and mosasaurs. A few rare, fragmentary dinosaur fossils are known, including an abelisaur and a sauropod. It was originally assumed that the azhdarchid Phosphatodraco mauritanicus was the only pterosaur present at the locality. However, in addition to Barbaridactylus, more recent studies have revealed at least five more pterosaur species from this location, including Alcione, Simurghia and Tethydraco.
