= 1886 in paleontology =

Paleontology or palaeontology is the study of prehistoric life forms on Earth through the examination of plant and animal fossils. This includes the study of body fossils, tracks (ichnites), burrows, cast-off parts, fossilised feces (coprolites), palynomorphs and chemical residues. Because humans have encountered fossils for millennia, paleontology has a long history both before and after becoming formalized as a science. This article records significant discoveries and events related to paleontology that occurred or were published in the year 1886.

== Plants ==
=== Superasterids ===
Name	Novelty	Status	Authors	Age	Unit	Location	Synonymized taxa	Notes	Images
Patzea johniana	Comb nov	jr synonym	(Göppert & Berendt) Conwentz	Eocene; Lutetian-Priabonian	Baltic Amber	Europe; Baltic Sea Coast	Patzea gentoides Casp. (1872)	Identified as a loranthaceous mistletoe relative. First named as Ephedrites johnianus (1845); Moved from Ephedra johniana (1853); Moved to Arceuthobium johnianum (2017).	Arceuthobium johnianum
Patzea mengeana	Comb nov	jr synonym	(Göppert) Conwentz	Eocene; Lutetian-Priabonian	Baltic Amber	Europe; Baltic Sea Coast		Identified as a loranthaceous mistletoe relative. Moved from Ephedra mengeana (1883); Moved to Arceuthobium mengeanum (2017).	Arceuthobium mengeanum

=== Angiosperms ===
==== Superasterids ====
Name	Novelty	Status	Authors	Age	Unit	Location	Synonymized taxa	Notes	Images
Stewartia kowalewskii	Sp nov	Jr synonym	(Casp.) Sadowski & Hofmann	Eocene; Priabonian	Baltic Amber	Europe		A Symplocaceous flower species. Moved to Symplocos kowalewskii in 2023).	Symplocos kowalewskii

== Ichthyosaurs ==
=== New taxa ===
Name	Status	Authors	Age	Unit	Location	Notes
Ichthyosaurus cornalianus	Valid	Bassani	Late Triassic (Carnian)	Besano Formation	Italy	Type species of the mixosaurid genus Mixosaurus Baur, 1887.

== Archosaurs ==
=== Newly named basal archosauromorphs ===
Name	Status	Authors	Age	Unit	Location	Notes
Tribelesodon	Junior synonym	Bassani	Late Triassic		Italy	Junior synonym of Tanystropheus, a member of Protorosauria.

=== New pseudosuchian taxa ===
Name	Status	Authors	Age	Type locality	Country	Notes	Images
Pallimnarchus pollens	Nomen dubium	De Vis	Pliocene	Darling Downs	Australia	Pallimnarchus was informally named, but the name acquired widespread use. The syntype material consisted of multiple individuals of different crocodilian species and a later erected lectotype was lost. It was eventually declared a nomen dubium, with much of the material transferred into the genus Paludirex.	The lectotype of Pallimnarchus, B shows the only parts still known.

== Synapsids ==
=== Non-mammalian ===
Name	Status	Authors	Age	Unit	Location	Notes	Images
Haptodus	Valid	Gaudry	Early Permian	Millery Formation	France		
Naosaurus	Invalid	Cope	Early Permian	Red beds	USA		
