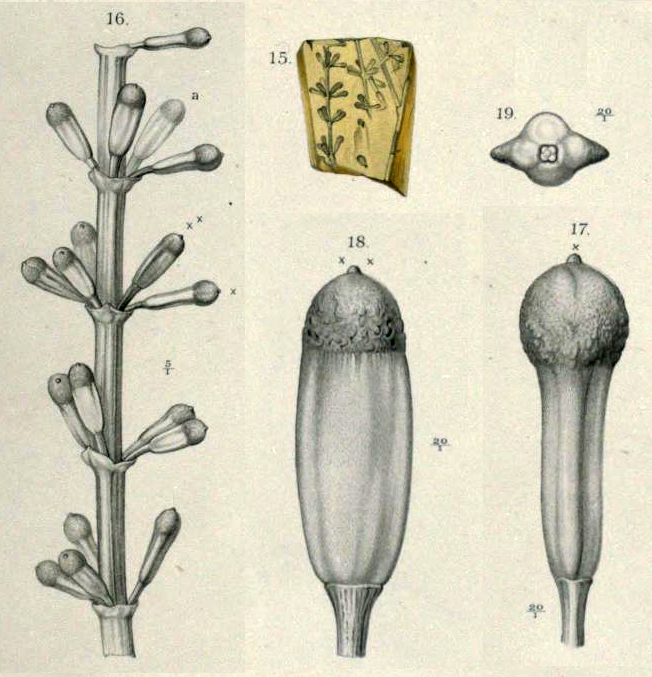
- 1883 illustration of fossil

Scientific classification
- Kingdom: Plantae
- Clade: Tracheophytes
- Clade: Angiosperms
- Clade: Eudicots
- Order: Santalales
- Family: Santalaceae
- Genus: Arceuthobium
- Species: †A. mengeanum

Binomial name
- †Arceuthobium mengeanum (Goeppert) Sadowski et al., 2017

Synonyms
- A. mengeanum synonymy: Ephedra mengeana Goeppert, 1883; Patzea mengeana Conwentz, 1886

= Arceuthobium mengeanum =

Arceuthobium mengeanum Temporal range: Lutetian–Priabonian

Species of fossil mistletoe

Arceuthobium mengeanum is an extinct species of dwarf mistletoe described from specimens in amber. The species was first named in 1845 and has been moved to several different genera since, with placement into Arceuthobium happening in 2017. It was native to the late Eocene Baltic amber forests of northern Europe. The known fossils are all isolated vegetation, but their morphology supports the probability they were hemiparasitic as the modern species are. It has been suggested that A. mengeanum and a group of related species played a part in generating canopy diversity and possibly increased resin generation in the Baltic amber forests.

== Distribution ==
The only documented specimens were part of the Franz Anton Menge amber collections. The collections were accumulated by Menge of Baltic amber collected along the Gdańsk region Baltic Sea coast of what is now Poland with an unknown portion of the collection being "sea amber" collected from the coast. Baltic amber is found as in situ deposits concentrated mostly in the Blue Earth Member of the Prussian Formation in the Baltic region, but the amber is also noted to wash ashore from drowned deposits in the sea itself and large amounts have been redeposited into sediments as young as the Oligocene. Due to uncertainty of origins for historic amber collections like Menge's, the specimens have been given a type locality of simply the "Baltic Sea coast" and an age range between Lutetian and Priabonian.

== History and classification ==
In the late 1870s and early 1880s Heinrich Göppert and Franz Anton Menge started writing and editing a multivolume work on Baltic amber. While investigating conifer fossil inclusions for volume 1, Göppert found a fossil that he considered similar to one he placed into the genus Ephedra in 1853. While he noted both the new fossil and Ephedra johniana to be similar, the flower placement and stem convinced him they were separate species. As such in the 1883 publication of Die Flora des Bernsteins und ihre Beziehungen zur Flora der Tertiärformation und der Gegenwart ("The flora of amber and its relationships to the flora of the Tertiary Formation and the present day") volume 1, he named the new species Ephedra mengeana, though he did not give clarity on if the species was named for Franz Menge who had died in 1880.

A brief 1872 note published a record of Johann Caspary's oral presentation for a new genus and species Patzea gentoides from an amber specimen in the Königsberg collections. This fossil included attached foliage and fruits on a stem but no flowers. Hugo Conwentz reviewed the E. johniana and P. gentoides inclusions for his 1886 work Die Angiospermen des Bernsteins along with an additional fossil in the collections of the Natural History Society of Emden. He concluded that the four fossils all belonged to the same species of plant, likely not an Ephedra relative but a flowering plant instead. Given this conclusion, he deemed the newer species a junior synonym of the 1845 species. However, due to the association of Ephedrites with Ephedra, Conwentz moved E. johnianus to Caspary's genus as Patzea johniana. He also revisited E. mengeana of only thee years earlier. He concurred with Göppert that the species was related to E. johnianus and moved it to Patzea as well, under the combination Patzea mengeana.

He suspected, upon reading Göpperts original 1845 description, that the angiosperm families Santalaceae and Loranthaceae were the more likely home of the fossil species. In his review of possible similar genera he noted Arceuthobium was close, but that the flowers of Patzea were borne on stalks, a condition not seen in Arceuthobium. Given the floral characters, Conwentz placed the genus into Loranthaceae, noting that in correspondence with both Caspary and Friedrich von Schenck, all were of similar opinion the species were loranthaceous plants.

The placement of Patzea and Patzea johniana within Loranthaceae has been accepted since the early 1900s, with comparison to various groups of mistletoe genera being made. In 2017 a research group led by German paleobotanist Eva-Maria Sadowski reexamined a number of putative Baltic amber mistletoe fossils in hopes of clarifying the nomenclature. The known fossil of Patzea mengeana were deemed lost in the time between 1886 and 2017, so the group evaluated the two given descriptions and new fossils of other species in Baltic amber. They concluded that Patzea mengeana matched the modern accepted sets of features for the genus Arceuthobium with only general morphology based differences that separate the species and which are considered possibly ancestral for the genus. As such they moved the species to Arceuthobium mengeanum.

== Description ==
The stems of Arceuthobium mengeanum have internode sections that are semi-cylinders to angular without any lengthwise striations. Owing to the limited amount of plant preserved in the type specimen the branching pattern at nodes is unknown. The fruits are present as groups of four or more at the internodes. Each fruit is an estimated 3.4–4 mm (0.13–0.16 in) long with distinct basal and apical sections and an overall elongated elliptical outline. The apical area comprises as little as 25% and as much as 50% of the whole fruit. The basal section of the fruits is a smooth light coloration, while the apical section is wrinkled in texture and notably darker in color. The stigmas, where present still are grouped as four external sections surrounding a fifth middle section.

== Paleoenvironment ==
Members of the family Viscaceae are all hemiparasitic on plant branches, with Arceuthobium favoring conifers such as pine, larch, and cypress species trees. Parasitized trees often form "witch's broom" branching with numerous small branches spouting from a single area on the trunk in a tangled clump. Witch's brooms are noted to weaken the infected trees and shorten their lifespan leading to more snags, canopy gaps, and tree falls in the forest. A result is an increase in canopy diversity across the forest landscape and increased habitat niches and ecological diversity for the forest. The witch's brooms act as specific habitat for a number of insect groups and nesting sites for arboreal animals.

A total of six distinct dwarf mistletoe species are known from Baltic Amber and the same ecological impacts were likely seen across the Baltic Amber forest. Comprised of an angiosperm and conifer mesophytic-mix, ecological investigations show the landscape of the forest encompassing intermingled costal and riparian forests with back and coastal swamp areas. Grass and carnivorous plant fossils indicate that sunny open areas were a notable component of the forest, with dwarf mistletoe driven canopy gap generation a likely contributor to the openings.
