= 1845 in paleontology =

Paleontology or palaeontology is the study of prehistoric life forms on Earth through the examination of plant and animal fossils. This includes the study of body fossils, tracks (ichnites), burrows, cast-off parts, fossilised feces (coprolites), palynomorphs and chemical residues. Because humans have encountered fossils for millennia, paleontology has a long history both before and after becoming formalized as a science. This article records significant discoveries and events related to paleontology that occurred or were published in the year 1845.

== Plants ==
=== Gnetophytes ===
Name	Novelty	Status	Authors	Age	Unit	Location	Synonymized taxa	Notes	Images
Ephedrites	Gen et sp. nov	jr synonym	Göppert & Berendt	Eocene; Lutetian-Priabonian	Baltic Amber	Europe; Baltic Sea Coast		First named as an Ephedra relative. Type species E. johnianus Species moved to Ephedra johniana (1853); Moved to Patzea johniana (1886); Moved to Arceuthobium johnianum (2017).	Arceuthobium johnianum

== Plesiosaurs ==
=== New taxa ===
Name	Novelty	Status	Authors	Age	Unit	Location	Notes	Images
Spondylosaurus		Jr. synonym	Fisher				Junior synonym of Pliosaurus.	Pliosaurus rossicus

== Synapsids ==
=== Non-mammalian ===
Name	Status	Authors	Age	Location	Notes	Images
Dicynodon	Valid	Owen	255 Million years ago.	Brazil; South Africa; Tanzania; Zambia		Dicynodon

=== Mammals ===
Name	Authors	Age	Location	Notes	Images
Coryphodon	Owen	52 Million years ago.	Belgium; Canada (Northwest Territories); China; France; UK; USA (Alabama, Colorado, Mississippi, Montana, New Mexico, North Dakota, Texas, Utah and Wyoming)	A hippo-like mammal.	Coryphodon
