= 1853 in paleontology =

Paleontology or palaeontology is the study of prehistoric life forms on Earth through the examination of plant and animal fossils. This includes the study of body fossils, tracks (ichnites), burrows, cast-off parts, fossilised feces (coprolites), palynomorphs and chemical residues. Because humans have encountered fossils for millennia, paleontology has a long history both before and after becoming formalized as a science. This article records significant discoveries and events related to paleontology that occurred or were published in the year 1853.

== Plants ==
=== Gnetophytes ===
Name	Novelty	Status	Authors	Age	Unit	Location	Synonymized taxa	Notes	Images
Ephedra johniana	Comb nov	jr synonym	Göppert & Berendt	Eocene; Lutetian-Priabonian	Baltic Amber	Europe; Baltic Sea Coast		Identified as an Ephedra species. Moved from Ephedrites johnianus (1845); Species moved to Ephedra johniana (1853); Moved to Patzea johniana (1886); Moved to Arceuthobium johnianum (2017).	Arceuthobium johnianum
