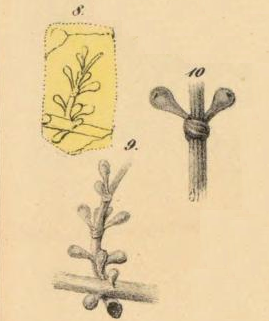
- 1845 illustration of fossils

Scientific classification
- Kingdom: Plantae
- Clade: Embryophytes
- Clade: Tracheophytes
- Clade: Angiosperms
- Clade: Eudicots
- Order: Santalales
- Family: Santalaceae
- Genus: Arceuthobium
- Species: †A. johnianum

Binomial name
- †Arceuthobium johnianum (Göppert & Berendt) Sadowski et al., 2017

Synonyms
- A. johnianum synonymy: Ephedrites johnianus Göppert & Berendt, 1845; Ephedra johniana (Göppert & Berendt) Goeppert, 1853; Patzea gentoides Caspary, 1872; Ephedra johniana (Göppert & Berendt) Goeppert & Menge, 1883; Patzea johniana Conwentz, 1886

= Arceuthobium johnianum =

Arceuthobium johnianum Temporal range: Lutetian–Priabonian

Species of fossil mistletoe

Arceuthobium johnianum is an extinct species of dwarf mistletoe described from specimens in amber. The species was first named in 1845 and has been moved to several different genera since, with placement into Arceuthobium happening in 2017. The species was native to the late Eocene Baltic Amber forests of northern Europe. The known fossils are all isolated vegetation, but the morphology supports the probability they were hemiparasitic as the modern species are. It has been suggested that A. johnianum and a group of related species played a part in generating canopy diversity and possibly increased resin generation in the Baltic Amber forest.

== Distribution ==
Only four documented specimens are known and all have been lost in the time since description. Collections of the time were accumulated from numerous locations across the region and the sites not indicated in description records. Baltic amber is found both as "in situ" deposits concentrated mostly in the Blue earth layer of the Prussian Formation in the Baltic region, but the amber is also noted to wash ashore from drowned deposits in the sea itself and large amount have been redeposited into sediments as young as the Oligocene. Due to uncertainty of origins for historic amber collections, the specimens have been given a type locality of simply the "Baltic Sea coast" and an age rage between Lutetian and Priabonian.

== History and classification ==
In 1845, Heinrich Göppert and Georg Berendt published the 125 page long Der Bernstein und die in ihm befindlichen Pflanzenreste der Vorwelt [Amber and the prehistoric plant remains contained within it], based on Berendt's Baltic amber collection that had been amassed in the Royal University of Berlin's Mineralogical Museum. Among the new plants described was a small stem section with buds and leaves that they believed to be related to the gnetophyte genus Ephedra. Due to it being a single incomplete female specimen, they placed their new species into a newly named genus Ephedrites which they considered related to Ephedra. They chose to name the new species Ephedrites johnianus as a patronym honoring Johann Friedrich John who investigated Baltic Amber in 1816. Only eight years later, Göppert revisited the species in a short work 1853 on amber updates. In the work he notes that the Franz Anton Menge amber collection provided a male specimen of his species which he felt validated the placement of E. johnianus directly into Ephedra as Ephedra johniana.

In a brief note published in the Schriften der Königlichen Physikalisch-Ökonomischen Gesellschaft zu Königsberg (Royal Physical-Economic Society of Königsberg) Johann Casparys oral presentation of a new genus and species Patzea gentoides from an amber specimen in the Königsberg collections. This fossil included attached foliage and fruits on a stem but no flowers. Hugo Conwentz reviewed the E. johniana and P. gentoides inclusions for his 1886 work Die Angiospermen des Bernsteins along with an additional fossil in the collections of the Natural History Society of Emden. He concluded that the four fossils all belonged to the same species of plant, likely not an Ephedra relative but a flowering plant instead. Given this conclusion, he deemed the newer species a junior synonym of the 1845 species. However, due to the association of Ephedrites with Ephedra, Conwentz moved E. johnianus to Caspary's genus as Patzea johniana. He was already suspicious upon reading the original 1845 text that the Santalacaceae and Loranthaceae were the more likely home of the fossil. In his commentary of similar genera he noted Arceuthobium to be close, but the flowers of Patzea were born on stalks, a condition not seen in Arceuthobium.

Given the floral characters Conwentz placed the genus into Loranthaceae, noting that in correspondence with both Caspary and Friedrich von Schenck, all were of similar opinion that the species was a loranthaceous plant.

The placement of Patzea and Patzea johniana within Loranthaceae has been accepted since the early 1900s, with comparison to various groups of mistletoe genera being made. In 2017 a research group led by German paleobotanist Eva-Maria Sadowski reexamined a number of punitive Baltic amber mistletoe fossils in hopes of clarifying the nomenclature. All four known fossils of Patzea johniana were deemed lost in the time between 1886 and 2017, so the group evaluated the various given descriptions and new fossils of other species in Baltic amber. They concluded that Patzea johniana matched the modern accepted sets of features for the genus Arceuthobium with only general morphology based differences that separate the species and which are considered possibly ancestral for the genus. As such they moved the species to Arceuthobium johnianum.

== Description ==
The stems of Arceuthobium johnianum have internode sections that are rounded cylinders without any striations or angles. The nodes themselves have a x shaped pattern when branching, with pairs of branches sprouting across from each other on the nodes. The leaves are larger than seen in modern species, with an notably elongated lance shape where the widest part of the blade is closer to the apex than the midpoint of the leaf. As seen in modern species the leaf margin is smooth with no teeth or lobes present. As with the branches, leaves are born in a cross pattern opposite of each other at the nodes. The flowers are structured with four fused sepals encircling the reproductive center. The fruits are present as groups of three or more at the internodes. Each fruit is usually roughly cone shaped, having a conical basal half that transitions into a globose apical area. The apical area of the fruits have the fused sepals present on the fruit tip forming a cap like structure.

== Paleoenvironment ==
Members of the family Viscaceae are all hemiparasitic on plant branches, with Arceuthobium favoring confifers such as pine, larch, and cypress species trees. Parasitized trees often form "witch's broom" branching with numerous small branches spouting from a single area on the trunk in a tangled clump. Witch's brooms are noted to weaken the infected trees and shorten their lifespan leading to more snags, canopy gaps, and tree falls in the forest. A result is an increase in canopy diversity across the forest landscape and increased habitat niches and ecological diversity for the forest. The witch's brooms are the habitat for a number of insect groups and nesting sites for arboreal animals.

A total of six distinct dwarf mistletoe species are known from Baltic Amber and the same ecological impacts were likely seen across the Baltic Amber forest. Being comprised of an angiosperm and conifer mesophytic-mix, ecological investigations show the landscape of the forest encompassed intermingled costal and riparian forests with back and coastal swamp areas. Grass and carnivorous plant fossils indicate that sunny open areas were a notable component of the forest, with dwarf mistletoe driven canopy gap generation a likely contributor to the openings.
