= Incestophantes =

Scientific classification
- Kingdom: Animalia
- Phylum: Arthropoda
- Subphylum: Chelicerata
- Class: Arachnida
- Order: Araneae
- Infraorder: Araneomorphae
- Family: Linyphiidae
- Genus: Incestophantes; Tanasevitch, 1992

Type species
- I. incestus (L. Koch, 1879)

Species
- 23, see text

Genus of spiders

Incestophantes is a genus of dwarf spiders that was first described by A. V. Tanasevitch in 1992.

== Species ==
As of May 2021 it contains twenty-three species, found in Canada, China, Finland, Georgia, Kazakhstan, Mongolia, Norway, Russia, Sweden, Ukraine, and the United States:

- Incestophantes altaicus Tanasevitch, 2000 – Russia (South Siberia)
- Incestophantes amotus (Tanasevitch, 1990) – Russia (Caucasus to Central Asia), Georgia, Kazakhstan
- Incestophantes ancus Tanasevitch, 1996 – Russia (South Siberia)
- Incestophantes annulatus (Kulczyński, 1882) – Central and Eastern Europe
- Incestophantes bonus Tanasevitch, 1996 – Russia (South Siberia)
- Incestophantes brevilamellus Tanasevitch, 2013 – Russia (South Siberia)
- Incestophantes camtchadalicus (Tanasevitch, 1988) – Russia (Kamchatka)
- Incestophantes crucifer (Menge, 1866) – Europe, Russia (Europe to West Siberia)
- Incestophantes cymbialis (Tanasevitch, 1988) – Russia (Far East, East Siberia)
- Incestophantes duplicatus (Emerton, 1913) – USA, Canada
- Incestophantes frigidus (Simon, 1884) – Europe (Alps)
- Incestophantes incestoides (Tanasevitch & Eskov, 1987) – Russia (Urals to Far East/East Siberia)
- Incestophantes incestus (L. Koch, 1879) (type) – Russia (Urals to Central/South Siberia), Mongolia
- Incestophantes khakassicus Tanasevitch, 1996 – Russia (South Siberia)
- Incestophantes kochiellus (Strand, 1900) – Norway, Sweden, Finland, Russia (Europe to East Siberia/Far East), China
- Incestophantes kotulai (Kulczyński, 1905) – Europe (Alps)
- Incestophantes lamprus (Chamberlin, 1920) – USA, Canada
- Incestophantes laricetorum (Tanasevitch & Eskov, 1987) – Russia (Europe to East Siberia/Far East)
- Incestophantes logunovi Tanasevitch, 1996 – Russia (South Siberia)
- Incestophantes mercedes (Chamberlin & Ivie, 1943) – USA
- Incestophantes shetekaurii Otto & Tanasevitch, 2015 – Georgia
- Incestophantes tuvensis Tanasevitch, 1996 – Russia (South Siberia)
- Incestophantes washingtoni (Zorsch, 1937) – USA, Canada
