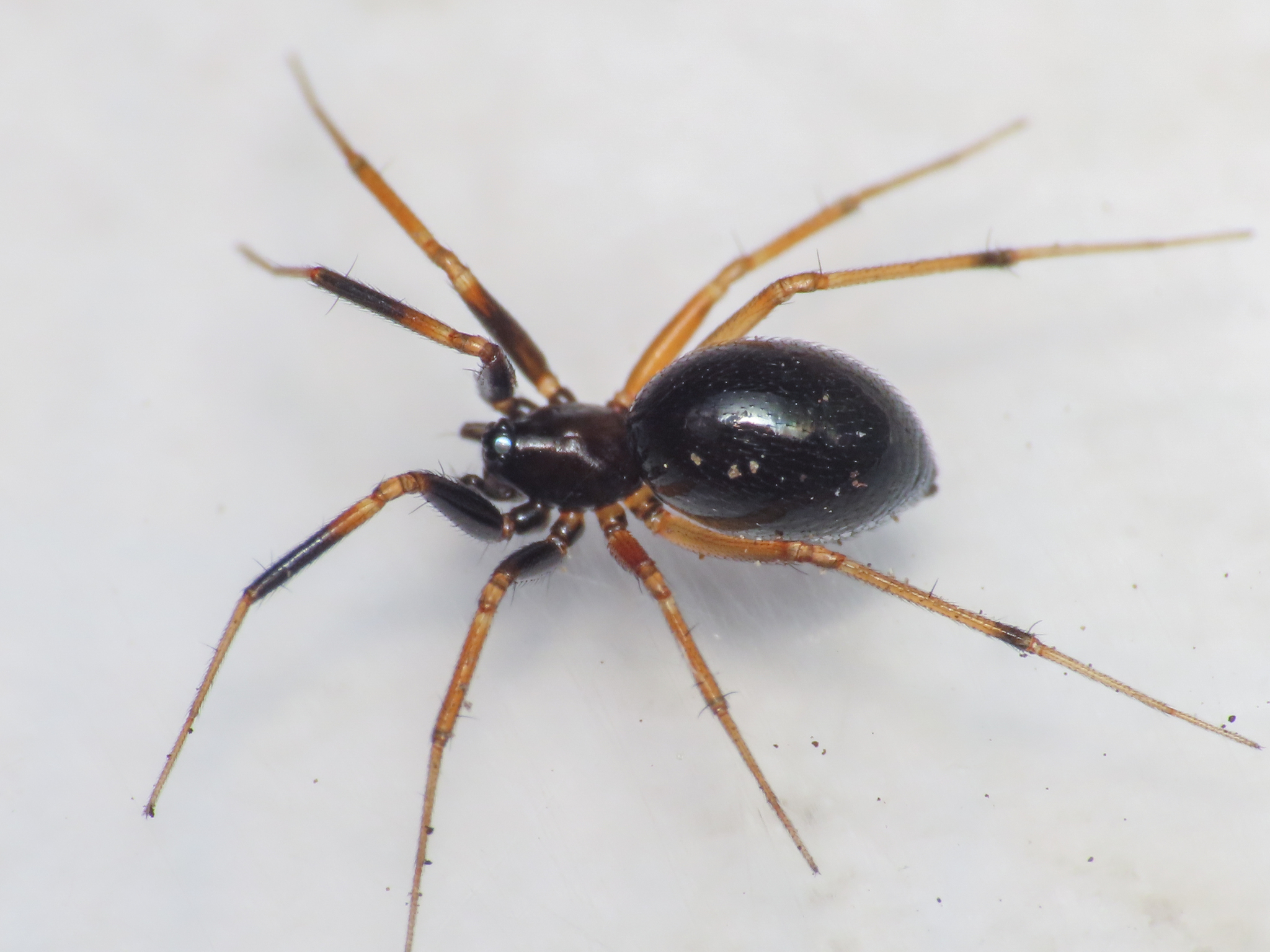
- Syedra nigrotibialis

Scientific classification
- Kingdom: Animalia
- Phylum: Arthropoda
- Subphylum: Chelicerata
- Class: Arachnida
- Order: Araneae
- Infraorder: Araneomorphae
- Family: Linyphiidae
- Genus: Syedra; Simon, 1884

Type species
- S. gracilis (Menge, 1869)

Species
- 7, see text

= Syedra (spider) =

Genus of spiders

Syedra is a genus of sheet weavers that was first described by Eugène Louis Simon in 1884.

== Species ==
As of May 2019 it contains seven species, found in Europe and the Middle Africa:

- Syedra apetlonensis Wunderlich, 1992 – Austria, Slovakia, Norway, Russia
- Syedra gracilis (Menge, 1869) (type) – Europe, Turkey
- Syedra myrmicarum (Kulczyński, 1882) – Central Europe
- Syedra nigrotibialis Simon, 1884 – France (Corsica)
- Syedra oii Saito, 1983 – China, Korea, Japan
- Syedra parvula Kritscher, 1996 – Malta
- Syedra scamba (Locket, 1968) – Congo
