= Tmeticus =

Scientific classification
- Kingdom: Animalia
- Phylum: Arthropoda
- Subphylum: Chelicerata
- Class: Arachnida
- Order: Araneae
- Infraorder: Araneomorphae
- Family: Linyphiidae
- Genus: Tmeticus; Menge, 1868

Type species
- T. affinis (Blackwall, 1855)

Species
- 9, see text

Genus of spiders

Tmeticus is a genus of sheet weavers that was first described by Anton Menge in 1868.

== Species ==
As of June 2022 it contains nine species, found in Europe, North America, Siberia, East Asia, and the Urals:

- Tmeticus affinis (Blackwall, 1855) (type) – Europe, Russia (Europe to Far East), Mongolia, Canada
- Tmeticus brevipalpus Banks, 1901 – USA
- Tmeticus maximus Emerton, 1882 – USA
- Tmeticus neserigonoides Saito & Ono, 2001 – Japan
- Tmeticus nigerrimus Saito & Ono, 2001 – Japan
- Tmeticus nigriceps (Kulczyński, 1916) – Russia (Urals to Far East)
- Tmeticus ornatus (Emerton, 1914) – USA, Canada
- Tmeticus tolli Kulczyński, 1908 – Russia (mainland, Sakhalin), Mongolia, China
- Tmeticus vulcanicus Saito & Ono, 2001 – Korea, Japan
