= 1872 in paleontology =

Paleontology or palaeontology is the study of prehistoric life forms on Earth through the examination of plant and animal fossils. This includes the study of body fossils, tracks (ichnites), burrows, cast-off parts, fossilised feces (coprolites), palynomorphs and chemical residues. Because humans have encountered fossils for millennia, paleontology has a long history both before and after becoming formalized as a science. This article records significant discoveries and events related to paleontology that occurred or were published in the year 1872.

== Plants ==
=== Gnetophytes ===
Name	Novelty	Status	Authors	Age	Unit	Location	Synonymized taxa	Notes	Images
Patzea gentoides	Gen et sp nov	jr synonym	Casp.	Eocene; Lutetian-Priabonian	Baltic Amber	Europe; Baltic Sea Coast		Identified as an Ephedra relative. Type species P. gentoides Synonymized with Patzea johniana (1886); P. johniana moved to Arceuthobium johnianum (2017).	Arceuthobium johnianum

== Molluscs ==
Taxon	Novelty	Status	Author(s)	Age	Unit	Location	Notes	Images
Scenella	Gen. et sp. nov.	Valid	Billings	Cambrian	Brigus Formation	Canada (Newfoundland and Labrador)	The type species is S. reticulata.	

== Dinosaurs ==
Taxon	Novelty	Status	Author(s)	Age	Unit	Location	Notes	Images
Agathaumas	Gen. et sp. nov.	Nomen dubium	Cope	Maastrichtian	Lance Formation	Wyoming	Dubious ceratopsid	
Colonosaurus	Gen. et sp. nov.	Jr. synonym	Marsh	Santonian	Niobrara Formation	Kansas	Misidentified as a marine reptile, before association with body of Ichthyornis recognized	
Eucamerotus	Gen. nov.	Nomen dubium	Hulke	Barremian	Wessex Formation	England	Later given the type species E. foxi	
Hadrosaurus agilis	Sp. nov.	Valid	Marsh	Santonian	Niobrara Formation	Kansas	Later given the genus name Claosaurus	
Tylosteus	Gen. et sp. nov.	Jr. synonym	Leidy	Maastrichtian	Lance Formation	Montana	Suppressed synonym of Pachycephalosaurus	

== Other animals ==
Taxon	Novelty	Status	Author(s)	Age	Unit	Location	Notes	Images
Aspidella	Gen. et sp. nov.	Valid	Billings	Ediacaran		Canada (Newfoundland and Labrador)	A discoid fossil of uncertain affinity. The type species is A. terranovica.	
