= Tmeticus ornatus =

Scientific classification
- Domain: Eukaryota
- Kingdom: Animalia
- Phylum: Arthropoda
- Subphylum: Chelicerata
- Class: Arachnida
- Order: Araneae
- Infraorder: Araneomorphae
- Family: Linyphiidae
- Genus: Tmeticus
- Species: T. ornatus

Binomial name
- Tmeticus ornatus (Emerton, 1914)

Species of spider

Tmeticus ornatus is a species of dwarf spider in the family Linyphiidae. It is found in the United States and Canada.
