= Friedrich von Schenck =

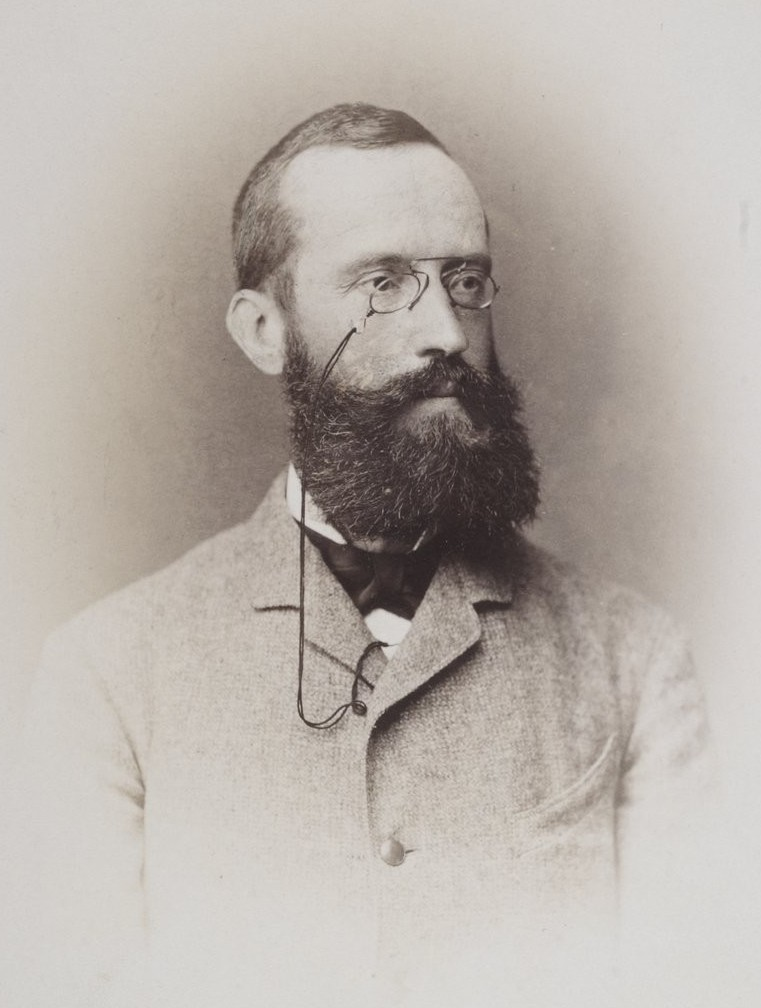
- von Schenck c. 1884

President of IHK Arnsberg
- In office 1897–1911
- Preceded by: W. Haber
- Succeeded by: Carl Ewers

Personal details
- Born: Wolfgang Friedrich Wilhelm von Schenck; 16 January 1851 Arnsberg, Province of Westphalia, Kingdom of Prussia
- Died: 20 April 1912 (aged 61) Kassel, Hesse-Nassau, German Empire
- Children: 9
- Occupation: Businessman, industrialist, advocate

Wolfgang Friedrich Wilhelm von Schenck VIII. colloquially Friedrich von Schenck (16 January 1851 – 20 April 1912) was a German businessman, industrialist and advocate.

== Early life ==
Schenck was born 16 January 1851 in Arnsberg, Kingdom of Prussia, the oldest of three children, of Wolfgang Friedrich von Schenck (1802–1885), judiciary council and notary, and his fourth wife, Auguste Lisette von Schenck (née Weiskirch; 1819–1888). He had two younger sisters; Tutta von Schenck (1852–1915) and Huberta Kessler (née von Schenck; 1854–1933). He had six half-sisters from the three previous marriages of his father.

== Personal life ==
On 11 September 1883, Schenck married Emilie Marie Louise Lenné (1859–1931), of Cologne, in Bad Neuenahr. They had nine children.
