= Hugo Conwentz =

German botanist (1855-1922)

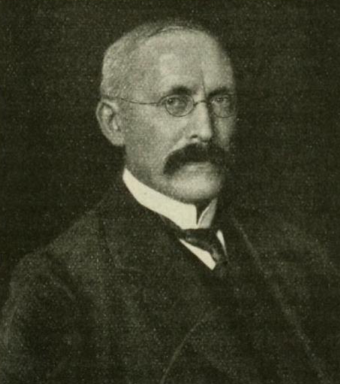
- Born: Hugo Wilhelm Conwentz; 20 January 1855; Danzig, Germany
- Died: 12 May 1922 (aged 67); Berlin, Germany
- Occupation: Botanist

Hugo Wilhelm Conwentz (20 January 1855, Sankt Albrecht near Danzig – 12 May 1922) was a German botanist. He is best known for his paleobotany studies of Baltic amber.

He studied in Wrocław and Göttingen. Beginning in 1876 he conducted paleobotanical studies as an assistant to Heinrich Göppert in Breslau. In 1879 he was appointed director of the Westpreußischen Provinzialmuseums (West Prussian Provincial Museum) in Danzig, a position he held for thirty years. In 1906 he became state commissioner of the newly founded Staatliche Stelle für Naturdenkmalpflege in Preußen, a regulatory body for natural heritage conservation in Prussia.

== Selected works ==
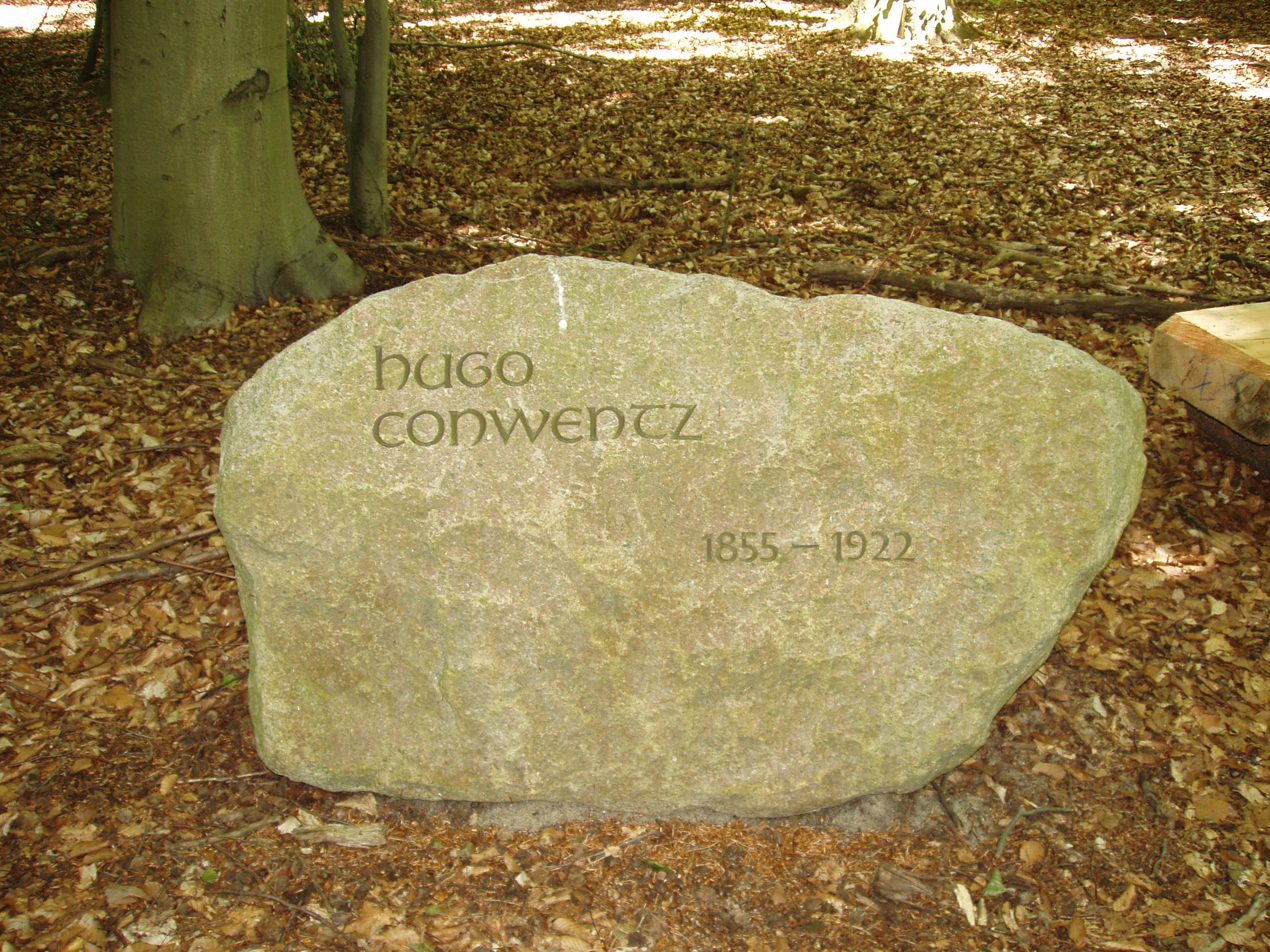
Hugo Conwentz memorial stone located in the Plagefenn nature reserve, Brandenburg, Germany.

- Monographie der baltischen bernsteinbäume, 1890 – Monograph of Baltic amber trees.
- Untersuchungen über fossile hölzer Schwedens, 1892 – Studies of fossil woods of Sweden.
- Die Gefährdung der Naturdenkmäler und Vorschläge zu ihrer Erhaltung, 1904 – The threat to natural monuments and proposals for their preservation.
- Beiträge zur Naturdenkmalpflege, (editor) 1910 – Contributions to natural heritage conservation.
