= Backswamp =

Environment on a floodplain where deposits settle after a flood

In geology, a backswamp is a type of depositional environment commonly found in a floodplain. It is where deposits of fine silts and clays settle after a flood. These deposits create a marsh-like landscape that is often poorly drained and usually lower than the rest of the floodplain.

Levees form as a result of the flooding process. Large amounts of rainfall cause the river to become too full during the flooding, where it overflows, carrying sediments into the floodplain. As the flooding slows and stops, the sediments are deposited, with the largest deposited closer to the river channel and the smaller ones deposited further away. These deposits result from the larger sediments losing energy faster than their smaller counterparts, which results in the creation of levees which are natural embankments that are close to the channel and help keep the river from flooding in the future.

When another flooding event occurs, the water level rises over the levees and floods the floodplains. As the flooding event stops, the water and all of the sediments it carried cannot drain out back into the river's main channel due to the levees, a backswamp forms.

A meandering river in a floodplain with labels for major characteristics. [1] The direction of the water flow. [2] Shore/bank from sediment deposition forms due to slower moving water that creates less friction and allows for the deposition of sediments. [3] Cut bank formed from faster-moving currents, which erodes the sides of the river, creating a "cliff" like bank. [4] Oxbow lakes form due to the rivers meandering scrolls cutting off, connecting two river bends, resulting in the straightening of the river. [5] Meander scrolls form due to the water in the river wanting to move a faster route (straight). [6] A natural levee forms from the flooding process, which helps the river not to flood during future flooding events. [7] Bluffs are the areas above the floodplain. [8] Floodplain is where the water goes since it is at a lower elevation than the surrounding land. [9] Backswamp is formed after a flooding event when floodwaters cannot return to the river channel.

Backswamps often occur in meandering river settings because they consist of a single highly sinuous channel that is continuously being affected by erosion. This meandering allows for the creation of oxbow lakes, as well as backswamps as shown in the figure above. These result from the river's meanders becoming too loopy and significant with increased erosion, causing the river to make a "short cut" by combining two or more of the river's bends called meander scrolls.

Backswamps have a poorly drained marsh-like landscape, which results in the soils around these depositional environments being anoxic. The anoxic environment results from poorly drained areas, resulting in high microbial activity due to low oxygen availability. The anoxic settings can cause the soil to change as a result of redox reactions. Because of the anoxic environment, there is not much oxygen which means the redox reactions have to find new terminal electron acceptors for these reactions. Once the redox reactions have used up all the available oxygen in the soil, they move on to nitrogen, iron, manganese, and sulfate in that order. These processes cause redoximorphic features, which render color changes in the surrounding soils.
