= Georg Karl Berendt =

German physician and naturalist (1790–1850)

Georg Karl (or Carl) Berendt (13 July 1790 – 4 January 1850) was a German medical doctor and paleontologist who was a native of Danzig.

He studied medicine and botany at the University of Königsberg, and from 1814 practiced medicine in Danzig. He is remembered for his large collection of amber inclusions, which amounted to 4,216 specimens of plants, insects, arachnids, myriapods, and more. His collection is now housed at the Museum für Naturkunde in Berlin.

With paleobotanist Heinrich Göppert (1800–1884), he published a work on botanical amber inclusions titled Der Bernstein und die in ihm befindlichen Pflanzenreste der Vorwelt (1845). In 1854 entomologist Carl Ludwig Koch (1778–1857) published the treatise Die im Bernstein befindlichen Myriapoden, Arachniden und Apteren der Vorwelt, based on material from Berendt's amber collection.

He was the father of Karl Hermann Berendt.
