= Anton Menge =

German entomologist

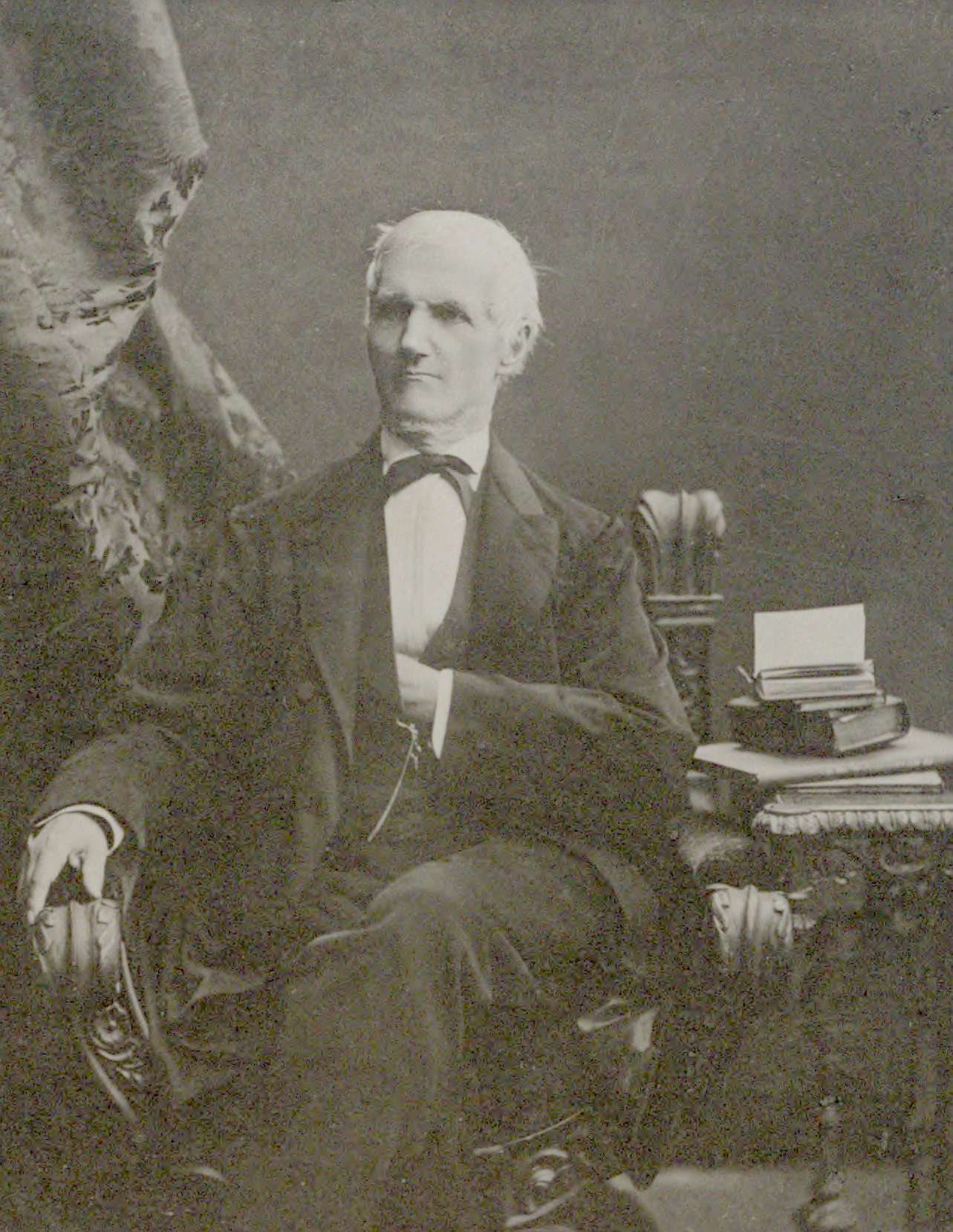
Anton Menge

Franz Anton Menge (15 February 1808 in Arnsberg – 27 January 1880 in Danzig) was a German entomologist.

Menge was a student of Physics, Chemistry and Natural History at the University of Bonn. He became professor at the Petrischule in Danzig. Menge published Preussische Spinnen or Spiders of Prussia between 1866 and 1878.

His collection of insects and spiders is in the State Natural History Museum in Gdańsk. It includes many fossil insects preserved in Baltic amber.

== Works ==
- Catalogus plantarum phanerogamicarum regionis Grudentinensis et Gedanensis. Typis C. G. Böthe, Grudentiae 1839
- Verzeichniss Danziger Spinnen. Danzig 1850
- Preussische Spinnen. Part I.–XI. Schriften der Naturforschenden Gesellschaft in Danzig. Danzig 1866–1878
