= Heinrich Göppert =

German botanist and paleontologist (1800–1884)

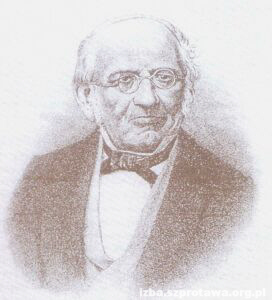
Heinrich Göppert

Johann Heinrich Robert Göppert (25 July 1800 – 18 May 1884) was a German botanist and paleontologist.

== Career ==
He was born in Sprottau, Lower Silesia, and died at Breslau. In 1831, he became a professor of botany, as well as curator of the botanical gardens in Breslau. In 1852, he became director of the botanical gardens.

He is particularly known for his work in paleobotany, being the author of many articles in this field. Göppert performed extensive research on the formation of coal and amber, and also conducted comparison studies between existing and fossil flora. In 1840, he demonstrated existence of plant cells in microscopic preparations of hard coal, which concluded a long-lasting debate on the origin of coal. His private collection of specimens of fossil flora was considered the finest in the world. Goeppert issued a series of thin sections, namely Arboretum fossile, Sammlung von Dünnschliffen fossiler Coniferenhölzer der palaeozoischen Formation (1881). This work has certain characteristics in common with an exsiccata.

He was the father of a notable lawyer, Heinrich Robert Göppert, grandfather of Friedrich Göppert, and great-grandfather of Maria Goeppert-Mayer (Nobel Prize in physics, 1963).

In 1861, he became foreign member of the Royal Netherlands Academy of Arts and Sciences. In 1862, he was elected as a member of the American Philosophical Society.

Göppert was a critic of Darwinism. In 1864 and 1865, he published papers criticising Charles Darwin's theory of common descent from research in botanical palaeontology.

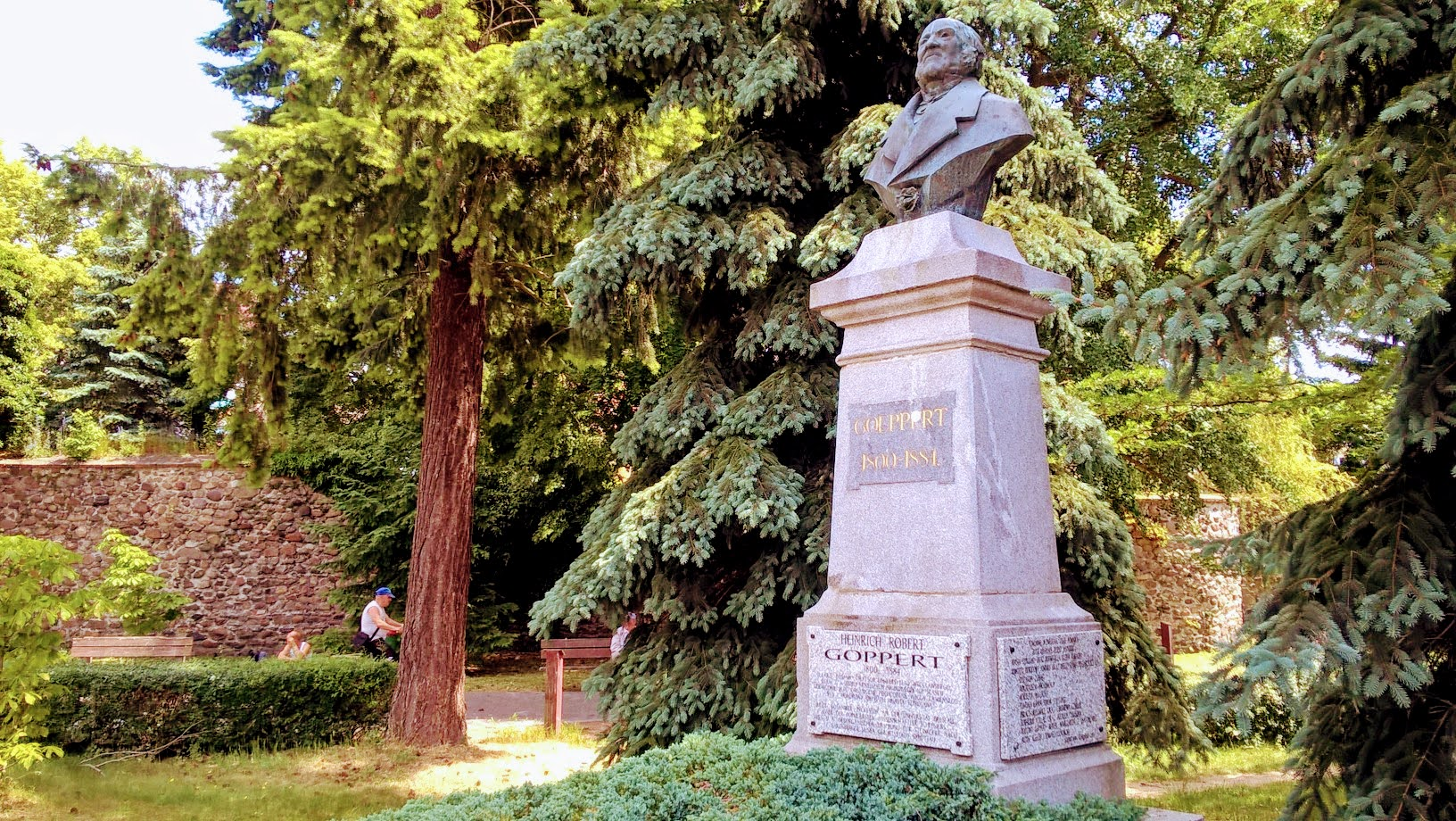
Heinrich Goeppert Monument in Szprotawa

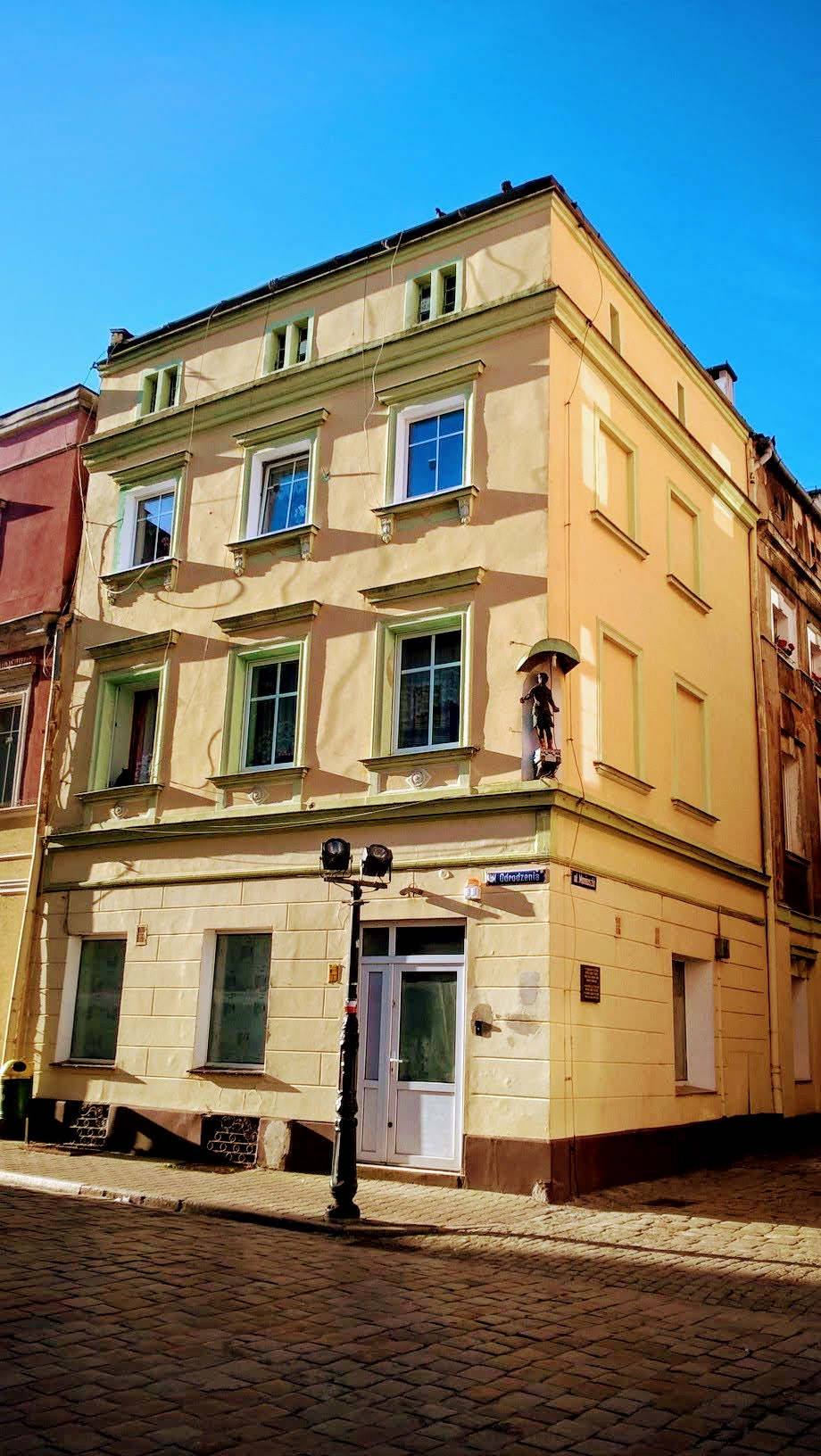
Heinrich Goeppert birth and family house in Szprotawa

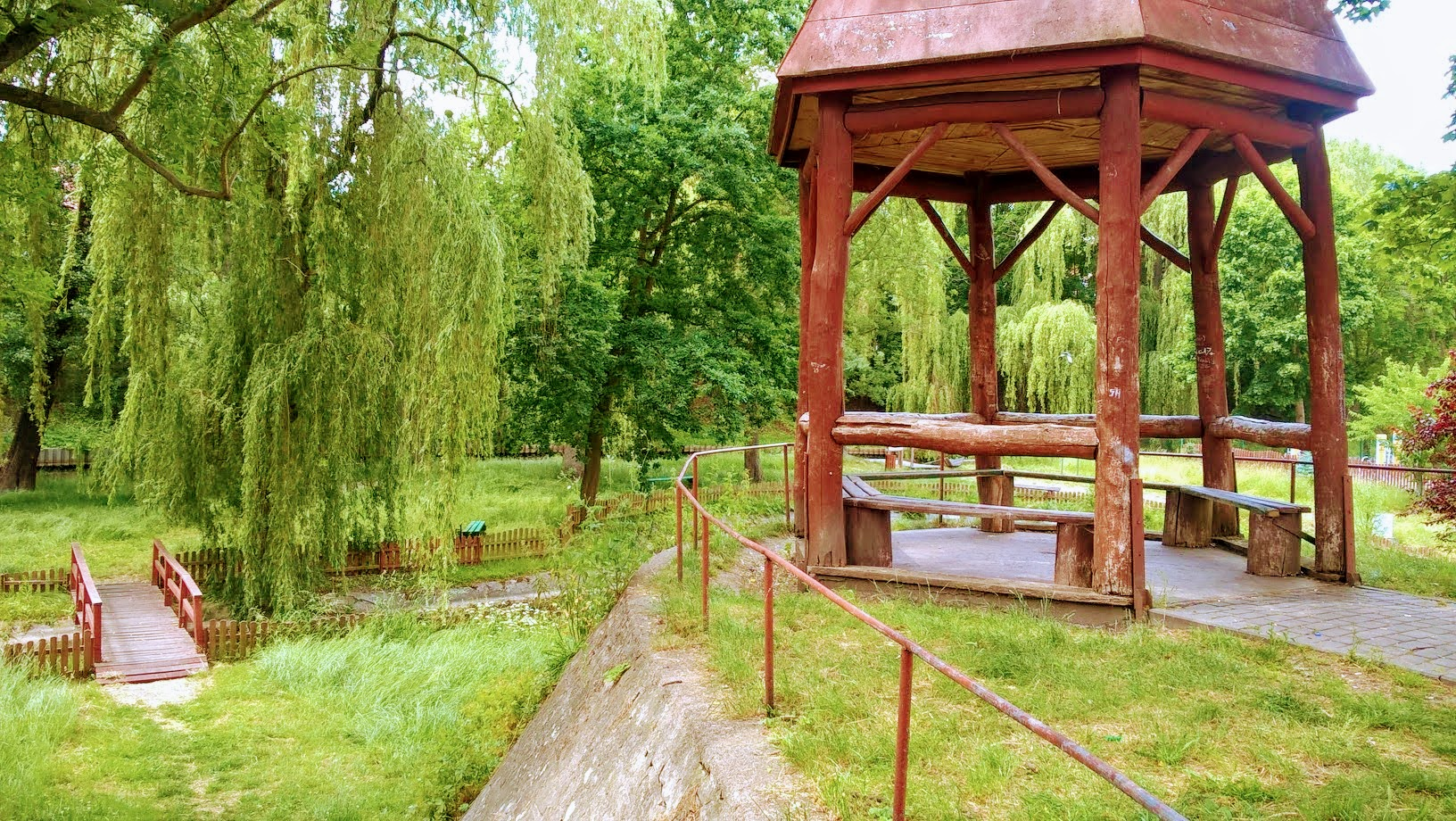
Heinrich Goeppert Park in Szprotawa

== Selected writings ==
- Die fossilen Farnkräuter (On fossil ferns) - (1836).
- De floribus in statu fossili (1837).
- De coniferarum structura anatomica (Anatomical structure of conifers) - (1841).
- Die Gattungen der fossilen Pflanzen, verglichen mit denen der Jetztzeit (Types of the fossil plants, and comparison to those of the present) - (1841–42).
- Ueber die chemischen Gegengifte, zum Gebrauche für Ärzte, Wundärzte und Pharmaceuten, so wie für academische Vorlesungen : mit 1 Tab. . Max, Berlin 2. Ausg. 1843 Digital edition by the University and State Library Düsseldorf.
- Der Bernstein und die in ihm befindlichen Pflanzenreste der Vorwelt (with Georg Karl Berendt, 1845).
- Abhandlungen über die Entstehung der Steinkohlenlager aus Pflanzen (1848).
- Abhandlung über die Beschaffenheit der fossilen Flora in verschiedenen Steinkohlenablagerungen eines und desselben Reviers (Condition of fossil flora in different hard coal deposits) - (1849).
- Monographie der fossilen Koniferen, verglichen mit denen der Jetztwelt (Monograph on fossil conifers) - (1850).
- Beiträge zur Tertiärflora Schlesiens (Contributions to Tertiary flora in Silesia) (1852).
- Die Tertiärflora von Schoßnitz in Schlesien (Tertiary flora of Schossnitz) (1855).
- Die Tertiärflora auf der Insel Java (Tertiary flora of the Island of Java) (1855).
- Über die fossile Flora der silurischen, der devonischen und der untern Kohlenformation (Fossil flora of the Silurian & Devonian Periods in regards to coal formation) - (1860).
- Die fossile Flora der permischen Formation (Fossil flora of mixed formation) (1864–65).
- Über Aphyllostachys, eine neue fossile Pflanzengattung, sowie über das Verhältnis der fossilen Flora zu Darwins Transmutationstheorie (Phyllostachys, a new fossil type; on the relationship of fossil flora to Darwin's theory of transmutation) - (1866).
