= Walter Siepmann =

German industrialist, engineer and inventor

Councilor of Belecke, Warstein
- In office 1 January 1952 – 31 December 1969

Personal details
- Born: March 11, 1902 Warstein, Kingdom of Prussia, German Empire
- Died: December 16, 1985 (aged 83) Külbe, Warstein, North Rhine-Westphalia, West Germany
- Resting place: Siepmann Family Cemetery, Belecke, North Rhine-Westphalia, Germany; 51.479705°N 8.343532°W
- Party: Christian Democratic Union of Germany (CDU)
- Spouse: Johanna Luise Trebs (m. 1933)
- Relations: Alfred Siepmann (brother)
- Children: 4
- Parent: Hugo Siepmann
- Education: Technical University of Darmstadt
- Occupation: Industrialist; inventor; politician
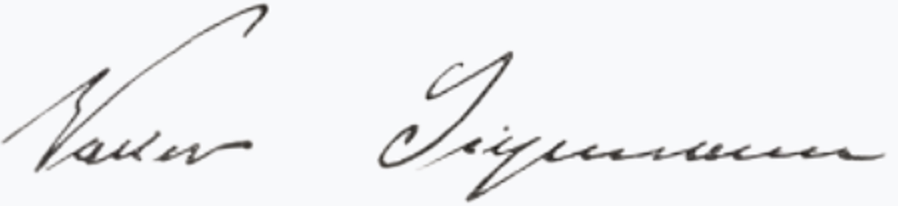
- Signature

Richard Rudolf Walter Siepmann colloquially Walter Siepmann, Sr. (11 March 1902 – 16 December 1985) was a German industrialist, engineer and inventor. He was the youngest son of Hugo Siepmann and member of the Siepmann family.

== Early life and education ==
Siepmann was born March 11, 1902 in Warstein, Kingdom of Prussia (presently Germany), the youngest of three children, to Hugo Siepmann, industrialist, philanthropist and gentleman farmer, and Luise Johanna Siepmann (née Lämmerhirt; 1876–1962), into a bourgeois family. His siblings were; Alfred Siepmann and Margarethe "Grete" Dassel (née Siepmann; 1898–1990).

His paternal family originally hailed from Schwelm, Westphalia, where they were affluent farmers and tradespeople. His maternal grandfather, Alfred Lämmerhirt, was a noted engineer and industrial manager who was involved in several companies, including the founding of the original predecessor to Westfalia Dinnendahl Gröppel, in the Ruhr valley as well as in Winterthur, Switzerland.

Siepmann completed his schooling years in Warstein, Lippstadt and Hagen. After completing his Abitur, he studied mechanical engineering at the Technical University of Darmstadt graduating in 1926. Siepmann reportedly suffered from dyslexia which prevented him from becoming a Diplom-Ingenieur on a graduate level. He joined the family company, then known as Peters & Co, in 1926.

== Career ==
Initially, Siepmann and his brother were employed as directors and took-over the management and technical development of the company, which at the beginning was still known as Peters & Co. Most of the technical development of Siepmann can be credited to him as he began to develop and patent his inventions in the field of ventiles and fixtures on an international level. This success is still a key element for the company up to this day and his products are used globally. During his tenure in the management of Siepmann he also became involved in various board of directors as well as advisory board roles such as with Commerzbank, one of the major banking corporations in Germany as well as the Mechanical Engineering Industry Association (VDMA).

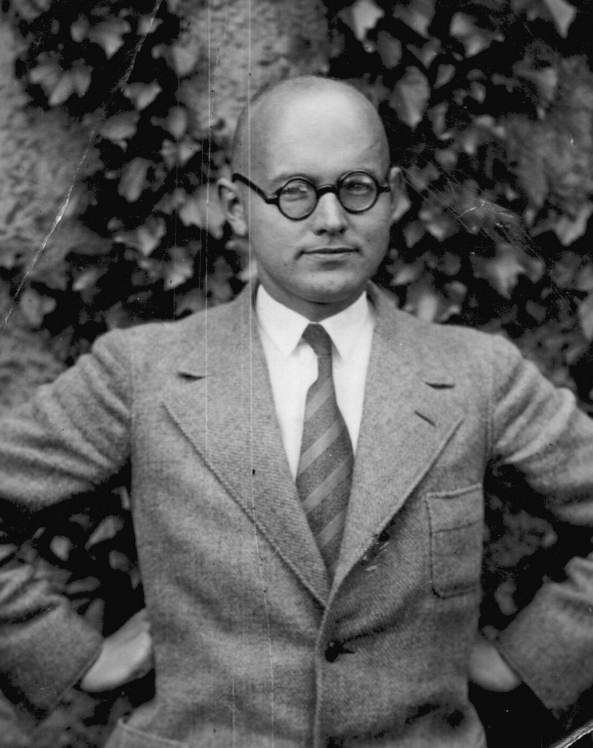
Walter Siepmann, c. 1925

Due to the Great Depression the company struggled and had to reduce staffing from 400 (1927) to 140 (1932), only in 1933 the company became a benefactor of the growing Nazi Germany, which needed suppliers for armament orders. Following those economical impacts they grew back very rapidly increasing staff from 143 (1932) to 312 (April 1934). Since 1937 the Siepmann company was the second largest drop forge factory in Germany and one of the most modern in entire Europe. There were 2,000–3,000 employees within the Siepmann companies. Since 1938, the company has been known as Siepmann-Werke, Inh. Hugo und Emil Siepmann & Söhne OHG (en. Siepmann-Works, Prop. Hugo and Emil Siepmann & Sons). In the 1940s it became a stock corporation, but was later turned back into a GmbH & Co KG. In 1946, they formed the subsidiary PERSTA Steel Fixtures GmbH & Co KG and the third generation entered management of the company.

In the course of his work in management, he developed numerous international patents for applications (Valves, housings and fittings). The market entry to North America followed the successful development of new types of oil fittings for mineral oil companies, primarily in the US and Canada. Under the leadership of his son-in-law, Hans-Georg Koenig, who was then the sales manager at PERSTA, Siepmann set up a branch in Montreal to sell the valves, the now defunct Forged Steel Valve Limited. His brother Alfred graduated from Humboldt University of Berlin with a degree in business administration. Siepmann's cousin, Ernst Siepmann, a son of Emil Siepmann was a fellow student of Alfried Krupp von Bohlen und Halbach, industrialist and main heir to Krupp, which ultimately became a member of the supervisory board of Siepmann. After the death of his elder brother in 1974, Siepmann acquired the majority of the Siepmann concern, and became sole proprietor. He handed over the company to his youngest son, Walter Siepmann, Jr. (1943-2021), gradually since 1969.

== Politics ==
Siepmann was elected to serve as councillor of Belecke (today a part of Warstein) in 1940. He was an active member of the Christian Democratic Union of Germany (CDU).

== Private ==
In 1933, Siepmann married Johanna Luise "Hannaliese" Trebs (1905–1986), who was educated as a concern pianist, daughter of Dr. Carl Ludwig Trebs (1877–1955), a general physician, and Josepha Clara Trebs (née Wilke; 1885–1969), both from Marburg respectively Korbach. She was an heiress to the fortune of her grandfather, Heinrich Wilke, who was a merchant that was also active in mining activities in German South West Africa. They had four children;

- Dieter Hugo Siepmann (1934–1960), who pursued an engineering degree at ETH Zurich, passed away from a brain tumor aged only 26, never married and without issue.
- Karin Siepmann, married firstly to Hans-Georg Koenig (died 2019), formerly and executive director at Siepmann and later an independent industrial representative, one son. She married secondly to Herbert Lehmler (1936–2024), an attorney of Munich, Germany, had three children.
- Verena Siepmann (born 1939), married to Eugen Hermann Vogt (1931-1985), an industrialist and engineer of Switzerland, two children.
- Walter Siepmann Jr. (1943–2021), engineer and main heir to the Siepmann concern; married to Hannelore "Anne" Franke (1945-2024), three children.

In 1937, Siepmann acquired a good portion of the local hill Külbe from the local parish in Belecke and commissioned an estate their which would later be known as Haus Möhnetal respectively Villa Siepmann. The family resided there contineously since 1939 with the youngest two children being born there. Later in life, Siepmann acquired condominiums in Munich, Germany and the property in Belecke became a family compound with several houses belonging to family members.

Siepmann died 16 December 1985 in Warstein, West Germany aged 83.

== Literature ==
- Dr Mechthild Barthel-Kranzbühler; Ein Schmied versteht sich gut aufs Schweissen: 50 Jahre im Gesenk schmieden und schweissen In: Das Westfälische Sauerland, Belecke/Möhne 1976 (in German)
- Rexhausen, Felix (February 9, 1965). "Mit dem Blasrohr leben". Der Spiegel. (in German)
- Hermann August Ludwig Degener, Walter Habel; Siepmann, Walter In: The German Who is Who?, 1970
