= Emil Siepmann =

German industrialist, patron and politician

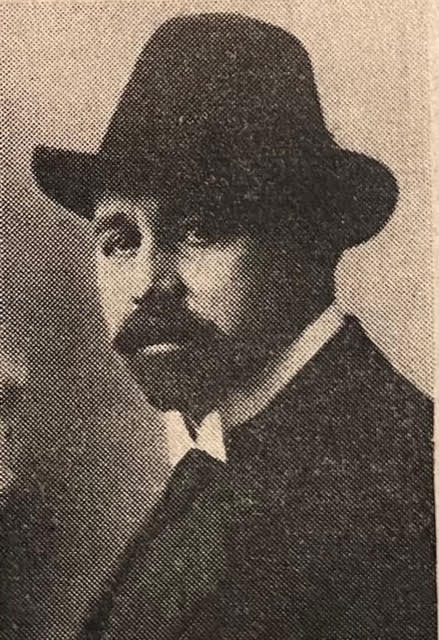
- Siepmann c. 1910

Member of the District Council of Arnsberg
- In office December 1, 1904 – 1915

Personal details
- Born: Emil Ludwig Siepmann; 25 August 1863 Hagen, Province of Westphalia, Kingdom of Prussia
- Died: 2 November 1950 (aged 87) Warstein, North Rhine-Westphalia, West Germany
- Resting place: Evangelical Cemetery, Warstein, North Rhine-Westphalia, Germany; 51.450236°N 8.347556°W
- Spouse: Magdalene Schütte (m. 1896; died 1941)
- Relations: Hugo Siepmann (brother); Peter Voswinckel (grandson); Walter Siepmann (nephew); Alfred Siepmann (nephew)
- Children: 5
- Occupation: Industrialist; politician; patron
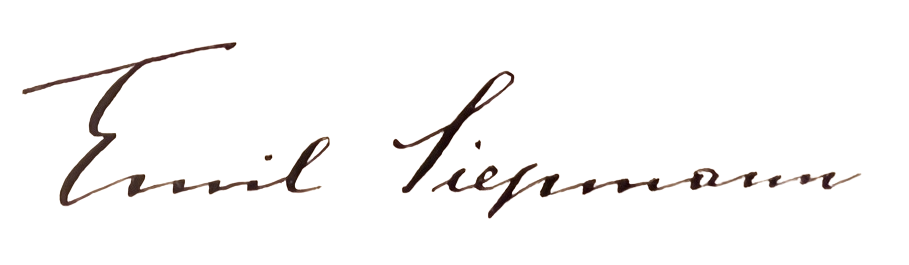
- Signature

Military service
- Allegiance: German Empire
- Branch/service: Royal Bavarian Infantry Lifeguards Regiment
- Rank: Soldier

Emil Ludwig Siepmann colloquially Emil Siepmann (German pronunciation: [ˈeːmiːl ˈziːpman]; August 25, 1863 – November 2, 1950) was a German industrialist, patron and politician who most notably served as a member of the District Council of Arnsberg from 1904 to 1915. He had Emil-Siepmann-Straße in Warstein named after him.

== Early life and education ==
Siepmann was born 25 August 1863 in Hagen, Province of Westphalia, Kingdom of Prussia, the fifth of nine children, to Heinrich-Wilhelm Siepmann (1827-1902) and Louise Siepmann (née Siepmann; 1828-1899), into a Protestant family.

His father originally hailed from Schwelm was the proprietor of the lumber wholesale company H. W. Siepmann which he operated in the second generation. Most of his ancestors were from the Sauerland region.

Due to the economic downturn of the Franco-Prussian War, he could not pursue academic studies, and instead completed a commercial apprenticeship at Bergenthal & Gabriel in Hagen, which was then managed by Constantin-Wilhelm Bergenthal, a son of Wilhelm Bergenthal. After completing his apprenticeship, Siepmann served one year as a volunteer soldier on the Royal Bavarian Infantry Lifeguards Regiment in Munich.

== Career ==
In the 1880s, Siepmann briefly worked at the lamp factory Wetzschewald & Wilmes in Neheim. After completing his military service, Siepmann worked in the railway industry, until his mid-20s. In the week before New Year's 1891, he went back to his home town of Warstein, where he was offered a position by his brother-in-law Louis Peters, who had taken over the former manufacturing plant of Hüsing & Company in Warstein. They were known for producing spades, shovels, hay and manure forks forged from steel and iron. From this period the company was named Peters & Co; however, the two initiators and entrepreneurs behind it were Emil and Hugo Siepmann. He was the commercial and technical director, while his brother, also a partner, was mainly active in the distribution of the products. Around 1895 they employed already about 90 people and became very influential local industrialists.

Over time, the company was completely converted to drop forging. In 1916 a new hammer was built with an 85-ton anvil. That was the heaviest hammer that existed in a production plant in Germany at the time. All bridges from Soest to Warstein had to be reinforced for its transport to Siepmann's works. The company had been an important supplier to the bicycle and later to the automobile and railroad industries since the turn of the century. Siepmann was also active as a patron in his workforce and the place. In 1921, the Siepmann brothers donated 250,000 marks for the construction of a children's home on the island of Norderney. He also put his skills at the service of the public when he was elected to the district council Arnsberg in November 1904 in the regular supplementary election from the electoral association of larger landowners. He campaigned for new railway connections and a power station. He was a member of the relevant commissions. From 1909 to 1929 he was also a board member of the Sparkasse Warstein.

== Personal life ==
In 1896, Emil Siepmann married Marie Magdalene Conradine (née Schuette; 1875–1941). The couple had five children, of which four reached adulthood.

- Hans Siepmann (4 November 1897 – 31 July 1919); deemed successor of Emil but died early aged 22.
- Lotte Siepmann (8 April 1900 – 7 January 1970); married Dr. med. Carl Mueller of Soest, with issue.
- Gerhard Siepmann (1904–1904), died in childbed
- Ernst Ludwig Siepmann (20 November 1906 – 21 April 1968), director at Siepmann , without issue.
- Kaethe Siepmann (12 February 1910 – 13 June 1986); married Carl Voswinkel of Soest; four children, including Peter Voswinckel (born 1951)

Siepmann passed away 2 November 1950 aged 87, only two weeks after his younger brother, Hugo Siepmann.
