= Hugo Siepmann =

German industrialist and patron

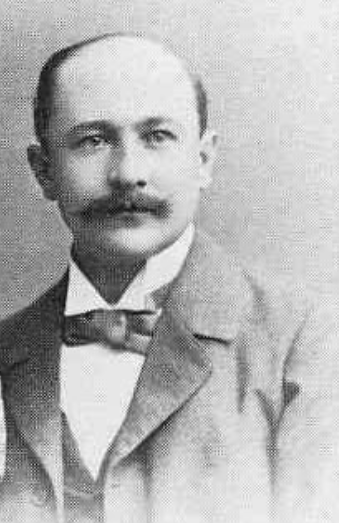

President of IHK Arnsberg
- In office 1933–1938
- Preceded by: Georg Dassel
- Succeeded by: Fritz Honsel

Personal details
- Born: Richard Hugo Siepmann; 24 May 1868 Hagen, Province of Westphalia, Kingdom of Prussia
- Died: 4 October 1950 (aged 82) Warstein, West Germany (now Germany)
- Resting place: Evangelical Cemetery, Warstein, North Rhine-Westphalia, Germany; 51.450236°N 8.347556°W
- Spouse: Luise Lämmerhirt (m. 1897)
- Relations: Emil Siepmann (brother); Alfred Lämmerhirt (father-in-law)
- Children: Grete; Walter; Alfred
- Occupation: Industrialist, philanthropist, gentleman farmer
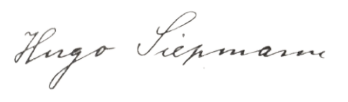
- Signature

Military service
- Allegiance: German Empire
- Branch/service: Reserve Infantry Regiment 81
- Years of service: 1891–1892
- Rank: Soldier (one-year volunteer)

Richard Hugo Siepmann known as Hugo Siepmann (German pronunciation: [ˈziːpman]; 24 May 1868 – 4 October 1950) was a German industrialist, philanthropist and gentleman farmer. He was one of the founders of the Siepmann concern, once Germany's second largest drop steel foundry. Between 1933 and 1938, Siepmann served as president of the IHK Arnsberg. From 1939 he was appointed honorary president.

== Early life and education ==
Richard Hugo Siepmann was born on 24 May 1868, in Hagen, Province of Westphalia, Kingdom of Prussia, the seventh of nine children, to Heinrich-Wilhelm Siepmann (1827-1902) and Louise Siepmann (née Siepmann; 1828-1899), into a Protestant family.

His father originally hailed from Schwelm was the proprietor of the lumber wholesale company H. W. Siepmann which he operated in the second generation. Most of his ancestors were from the Sauerland region.

Through his father's business relations, was able to secure a commercial apprenticeship at J.C. Söding & Halbach, a steel manufacturing company, in Hagen. He initially worked there until being deployed by his brother Emil Siepmann to lead the commercial department of Peters & Company in Warstein.

== Career ==
In 1892, he was deployed by his brother Emil Siepmann, who took-over the management of Peters & Company in Warstein. Their common brother-in-law bought the former Hüsing & Co plant who went into bankruptcy and continued to produce under new management and name.

Siepmann was active in the distribution of the steel products, which were mainly used in the agricultural sector. Over time, the company was completely converted to drop forging. In 1916 a new hammer was built with an 85 ton anvil. That was the heaviest hammer that existed in a production plant in Germany at the time. All bridges from Soest to Warstein had to be reinforced for its transport to Siepmann's works. The company had been an important supplier to the bicycle and later to the automobile and railroad industries since the turn of the century. Siepmann was also active as a patron in his workforce and the place.

His first public endowment was in 1907, when he contributed 5 Goldmark to the construction the Equestrian Monument in Windhoek (then German South West Africa). In 1916, he and his brother Emil, contributed over 45,000 Papiermark to a variety of philanthropic causes. In 1921, the Siepmann brothers donated 250,000 Papiermark for the construction of the Warburg children's home, an orphanage, on the North German island of Norderney. Additionally, Siepmann was among the founders and patrons of the Kriegsstiftung des Kreises Arnsberg, which provided aid to families affected from World War I.

Siepmann held numerous honorary posts and was on the Board of Directors for the Warstein Saving's Union (Sparkasse). Since 1935, Siepmann was a board member (supervisory board), of Maschinenbau-Aktiengesellschaft (English: Mechanical Engineering Corporation) in Kassel (previously known as Beck & Henkel).

== Personal life ==
In 1897, Siepmann married Louise Emilie Johanna (née Lämmerhirt; 1876-1962), daughter of Alfred Lämmerhirt, an engineer and industrial manager, and Emilie Lämmerhirt (née Schmiedt), originally from Stolberg, Province of Saxony (now Saxony-Anhalt). Lämmerhirt was the founder of Lämmerhirt & Brandenburg in 1872, an original predecessor of Westphalia Dinnendahl Gröppel (WEDAG), a manufacturing company that produced mining equipment.

The couple had three children;

- Louise Emilie Margarethe "Grete" Siepmann(1898-1990), married Georg Dassel (1881-1944), a marble manufacturer, of Allagen, a son of Georg Dassel, Sr.; four children.
- Alfred Hugo Heinrich Siepmann (1899-1974), businessman, politician and former military officer, involved in a variety of companies such as Siepmann, Dresdner Bank (banking) and Gerling-Konzern (insurance); married firstly to Jenny Wilkesmann, an heiress to the Rautenbach concern; three five children, married secondly to Annaliese Bobring, his former secretary.
- Rudolf Richard "Walter" Siepmann (1902-1985), engineer and main heir to Siepmann; married to Johanna Luise Trebs (1905-1986), a daughter of Dr. Carl L. Trebs and Josefa Trebs (née Wilke); four children.

Siepmann passed away 4 October 1950 in Warstein, West Germany aged 82.
