= Georg Dassel =

German industrialist, philanthropist and politician

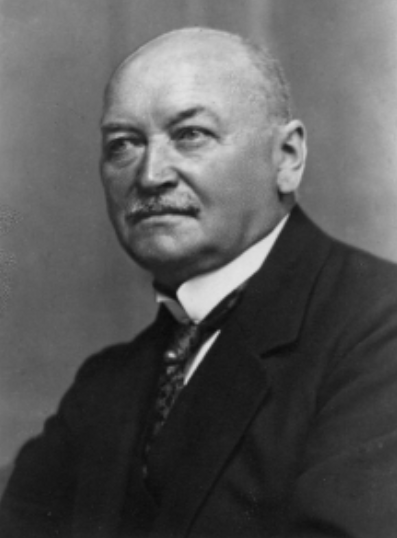

Member of the Landtag of Province of Westphalia
- In office 1917–1919
- Constituency: Arnsberg

Personal details
- Born: Georg Anton Dassel; 22 December 1852 Düsseldorf, Rhine Province, German Empire
- Died: 8 March 1934 (aged 81) Allagen, North Rhine-Westphalia, Nazi Germany
- Spouse: Maria Karoline Hassenkamp (m. 1880; died 1931)
- Children: 8
- Occupation: Industrialist, quarry owner, marble manufacturer, philanthropist and politician

Military service
- Allegiance: Prussia
- Branch/service: 2nd Westphalian Hussar Regiment, No. 11
- Years of service: 1871-1872
- Rank: Military volunteer

Georg Anton Dassel (/dɑːssəl/; dass-əl; 22 December 1852 – 8 March 1934) was a German industrialist, marble manufacturer, philanthropist and politician. Dassel was the majority owner of the Westphalian Marble Works (German: Westfälische Marmorwerke AG). He served several terms as a member of the Landtag Province of Westphalia for the Arnsberg district. In 1887, Dassel acquired the historic neoclassical Dassel Mansion (now an official landmark of Warstein and local museum), and renovated it to its current state. His eldest son, Georg, Jr., married Margarete 'Grete' Siepmann, a daughter of Hugo Siepmann.

== Early life and education ==
Dassel was born on 22 December 1852 in Düsseldorf, Rhine Province, German Empire to Ludwig Anton Dassel (1822-1888) and Johanna Sophie Helene (née Buddeberg; 1827–1894). His paternal lineage is an offspring of the noble Dassel family. He attended the private school of Wilhelm Herchenbach and then completed the Realgymnasium in Düsseldorf. Between 1868 and 1870 he completed a commercial apprenticeship with I.P. Rittenhaus & Company, an international textile concern, active in Turkey, Africa and India.

== Career ==
During the Franco-Prussian War, he led the company, after many of its male employees were drafted into the war. Between 1879 and 1881 he worked as an employee for a private bank in Düsseldorf. Since 1881, he has been active in the stone industry. He took a stake in a marble company and opened a grinding shop in Reichenbach, from which Deutsche Steinindustrie AG emerged. Finally, he became self-employed by taking over the operations of the Westfälische Marmorwerke AG in Allagen (“Victoriawerke”), which had been shut down for a number of years, and which he reopened in 1886. Acquisitions such as that of a competing plant in Borghausen (1894), Liethammer (1898) and the Syenit plant in Schönberg (1900) followed.

== Politics ==
Dassel served as a member of the provincial legislature, Landtag of the Province of Westphalia from 1917 to 1919.

== Personal life ==
Since 1880, Dassel has been married to Marie Karoline (née Hassenkamp; 1862–1931), with whom he had eight children;

- Georg Dassel, Jr. (1881-1944), married Grete Siepmann, a daughter of Hugo Siepmann, owner and resident of Dassel Mansion from 1934 to 1944. Four sons; Georg Hugo Rolf (1922-1944), Klaus Dassel (1924-1985), Walter (1929-2017) and Bernd (1940-2001)
- Paul Dassel (1882-1924), owner of quarry in Wallen, never married.
- Else Dassel (1886-1968)
- Hans Walter Dassel (1887-1929)
- Arthur Christian Erich Dassel (1892-1956) mayor of Allagen (1945–56) and namesake of Erich-Dassel-Strasse, resided in Sichtigvor

Dassel died aged 81 at Dassel Mansion in Allagen, Germany. Dassel was among the first automobile owners in Warstein being registered as such since at least 1909.
