= Peter Voswinckel =

German physician, author and medical historian

- Born: 9 November 1951 (age 74); Soest, North Rhine-Westphalia, West Germany
- Education: Archivgymnasium Soest
- Alma mater: University of Konstanz; University of Münster; University of Duisburg-Essen; LMU Munich
- Occupations: Physician, medical historian, professor, researcher
- Organization(s): German Society for Hematology and Medical Oncology (formerly)
- Children: 2
- Relatives: Emil Siepmann (maternal grandfather)
- Family: Siepmann family

Peter Voswinckel (German pronunciation: [foːssvɪnkeːl]; born 9 November 1951) is a German physician, author and medical historian. Between 2012 and October 2021, Voswinckel was the head of the archives and the historical research of the German Society for Hematology and Medical Oncology. He is a member of the Siepmann family.

== Early life and education ==
Voswinckel was born in 1951 in Soest, West Germany to Carl Voswinckel (1902–1967) and Käthe (née Siepmann; 1910–1994). His father was a merchant who later lived and died in Bad Kissingen. His mother was the youngest daughter of Emil Siepmann and therefore he is also a member of the Siepmann family. He had three older brothers; Klaus (1940–2009), Gert (1946–1946), Hans (1946-1946) and Johann Christian (1946–1978). In 1970, Voswinckel completed his Abitur at Archivgymnasium in Soest and then studied Medicine at the University of Konstanz, University of Münster, University of Duisburg-Essen and LMU Munich. In 1981, he became a licensed physician. He completed his MD in 1982 with the PhD work titled "Das Auto und seine Welt im Spiegel des deutschen Ärzteblattes 1907-1975".

== Career ==
Initially, Voswinckel worked as assistant physician in hematology and oncology, until he changed into the field of medical history, completing a PhD in 1985. Between 1992 and 2002, Voswinckel worked as scientific employee at the Institute for Medical and Scientific History in Lübeck. His projects included topics such as medical biography and emigration research. In 1997, Voswinckel became a professor at RWTH Aachen University. After 2002, he was primarily engaging in independent work as medical historian. Between 2012 and October 2021, he was the head of the archives and historical research of the German Society for Hematology and Medical Oncology.

== Personal life ==
Voswinckel is married and has two children. Since 2020, he is again resident of Schleswig-Holstein.

== Literature ==
- Der Fall Seveso. Kurzfassung eines Seminarvortrags mit Bildern. Seminar über Umweltprobleme mit Besonderer Berücksichtigung der Strahlenbelastung, Universität Münster, WS 76/77. Institut für Strahlenbiologie. Klartext, Bremen 1977. (in German)
- Arzt und Auto. Das Auto und seine Welt im Spiegel des Deutschen Ärzteblattes von 1907 bis 1975 (= Studien zur Medizin-, Kunst- und Literaturgeschichte. Bd. 4). Murken-Altrogge, Münster 1981, ISBN 3-921801-06-0. doi:10.4126/FRL01-006427234. (in German)
- 50 Jahre Deutsche Gesellschaft für Hämatologie und Medizinische Onkologie. Murken-Altrogge, Herzogenrath 1987, ISBN 3-921801-47-8. (in German)
- Der schwarze Urin. Vom Schrecknis zum Laborparameter. Urina Nigra. Alkaptonurie, Hämoglobinurie, Myoglobinurie, Porphyrinurie, Melanurie. Blackwell Wissenschaft, Berlin 1993 [Vertrieb: Georg Olms Verlag, Hildesheim], ISBN 3-89412-123-8. (in German)
- als Herausgeber: Isidor Fischer: Biographisches Lexikon hervorragender Ärzte der letzten fünfzig Jahre. Band III: Nachträge und Ergänzungen (Abad–Komp). Olms, Hildesheim 2002, ISBN 3-487-11659-6. (in German)
- Geführte Wege. Die Lübecker Märtyrer in Wort und Bild. Butzon & Bercker, Kevelaer 2010, 3. Aufl. 2011, ISBN 978-3-7666-1391-2. (in German)
- Dokumente zum Thema Lübecker Märtyrer 1941–1945, im Auftrag des Kulturbüros der Hansestadt Lübeck, gefördert von der Gemeinnützigen Sparkassenstiftung zu Lübeck, zusammengestellt von Peter Voswinckel. Ohne Verlag, Lübeck 2011 (in German)
- 1937-2012. Die Geschichte der Deutschen Gesellschaft für Hämatologie und Onkologie im Spiegel ihrer Ehrenmitglieder. – „Verweigerte Ehre“. Dokumentation zu Hans Hirschfeld. Deutsche Gesellschaft für Hämatologie und Medizinische Onkologie e.V.: [Berlin 2012] 3. Ergänzte Aufl. Berlin 2020, 170 S. ISBN 978-3-00-039487-4. doi:10.4126/FRL01-006424707. (in German)
- Erinnerungsort Krebsbaracke. Klarstellungen um das erste interdisziplinäre Krebsforschungsinstitut in Deutschland (Berlin, Charité). 1. Aufl. 2014, 2. durchgesehene und erweiterte Aufl. 2019. Deutsche Gesellschaft für Hämatologie und Onkologie (DGHO), Berlin, ISBN 978-3-9816354-2-3. doi:10.4126/FRL01-006424706. (in German)
- Das verschüttete Antlitz des Generalsekretärs. Spurensuche als posthume Würdigung von Prof. George Meyer (1860–1923). Zugleich ein medizinhistorisches Lehrstück. Deutsche Gesellschaft für Hämatologie und Medizinische Onkologie (DGHO), Berlin 2015, ISBN 978-3-9816354-8-5. doi:10.4126/FRL01-006427417. (in German)
- Fundstücke aus dem DGHO-Archiv 1937-2017. Deutsche Gesellschaft für Hämatologie und Medizinische Onkologie, Berlin 2017, 2. durchges. und erg. Auflage 2021, ISBN 978-3-9818079-2-9. doi:10.4126/FRL01-006426870. (in German)
- Dr. med. Josef Löbel, Franzensbad/Berlin (1882–1942). Botschafter eines heiteren deutschen Medizin-Feuilletons in Wien – Berlin – Prag. 1. Aufl. 2018, 3. durchgesehene und ergänzte Aufl. 2021. Deutsche Gesellschaft für Hämatologie und Medizinische Onkologie (DGHO), Berlin 2021, ISBN 978-3-9818079-4-3, 178 Seiten. doi:10.4126/FRL01-006425659. (in German)
- Verwässerung und Verleugnung einer Gründungsgeschichte der Onkologie. Ernst von Leyden und seine Bedeutung für Disziplinbildung und Internationalität. Hrsg. von der Deutschen Gesellschaft für Hämatologie und Medizinische Onkologie DGHO e.V., Selbstverlag DGHO e. V., Berlin 2019, ISBN 978-3-9818079-8-1. doi:10.4126/FRL01-006429431. (in German)
- Nachrufe und Gedenkartikel. Ernst von Leyden (1832–1910). Hrsg. von der Deutschen Gesellschaft für Hämatologie und Medizinische Onkologie DGHO e.V. (Historische Forschungsstelle und Archiv), Selbstverlag DGHO e. V., Berlin 2019. Digitale Version dem obenstehenden Titel (2019) beigeheftet. (in German)
