= Franz Dinnendahl =

German engineer and industrialist (1775-1826)

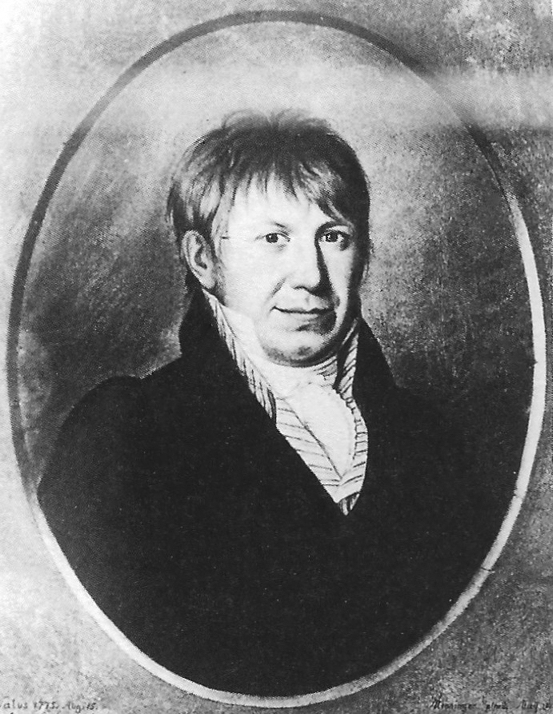
- Born: Franz Dinnendahl; 17 August 1775; Horst, Kingdom of Prussia (now Germany)
- Died: 15 August 1826 (aged 50); Rellinghausen, Kingdom of Prussia
- Occupations: Industrialist, engineer
- Relatives: Johann Dinnendahl (brother)

Franz Dinnendahl (20 August 1775 - 15 August 1826) was a German engineer and industrialist who was most prominently known for his pioneering work during the industrialization in the Ruhr valley and building the first steam engine in Essen in 1803. He was among the founder and namesake of Westfalia Dinnendahl Gröppel.

== Life ==
Dinnendahl was the son of a miller. As a youth he worked for two years as a swineherd and then for two years he earned his money selling coal. On the advice of his uncle he learnt to be a carpenter. It was here that his fascination for technology was born. When he received a contract to build a machine house out of wood, he became more interested in the machine than in the house.

The first steam engine - conceived in Britain - was employed in the Zeche Vollmond in Bochum-Langendreer. This was built in his first works in the Essener Innenstadt, on the Trentelgasse. Steam engines were to become extremely important for the extraction of coal in the Ruhr district. They were used, for example, for pumps to extract water from the lower levels. Dinnendahl established his own company and from 1801 to 1803 he constructed the first steam engine of his own construction.

In 1807 and 1808, he associated with Friedrich Krupp during the latter's spell as proprietor of the Gute Hoffnungshütte in Sterkrade.

In 1821 his works were burnt down and he built a new factory in Bergerhausen (later: Westfalia-Dinnendahl-Gröppel AG).

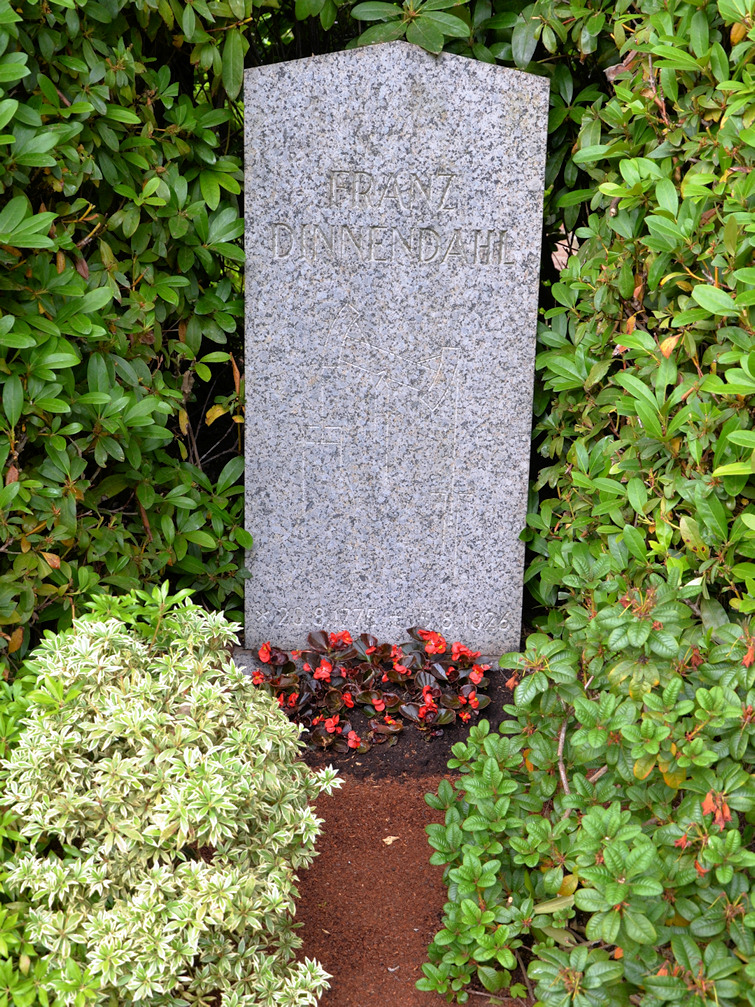
Memorial plaque on Trentelgasse 4

Popular legend has it that although he was an excellent engineer, he lacked business qualities such that he died in poverty in 1826. Yet the metal industry in general was experiencing hard times in the period after the end of the Napoleonic Wars and in 1818, Dinnendahl's works was a notable exception in that it showed a modest profit and employed 60 men

According to some sources, he was betrayed by the Hütte Gute Hoffnung, who appropriated his expertise and then ruined his business by introducing competition to his business.

He was buried in the cemetery in Rellinghausen. In 1936, he was re-interred in an 'Ehrengrab' in the Südwestfriedhof (South West Cemetery).

On the grounds of his former works at Trentelgasse 4 in Essen, a main tax office was erected in 1907/08, a memorial plaque was put there in remembrance of him. In 2006, the building was acquired by a private investor erworben, lavishly re-furbished and given the name of "Villa Dinnendahl". Today a private health academy occupies the building.

Dinnendahlstraße in Bergerhausen and Huttrop was named for Franz Dinnendahl in 1920. Elsewhere, the Franz-Dinnendahl-Realschule (school) in Essen-Kray bears his name.

== Literature ==
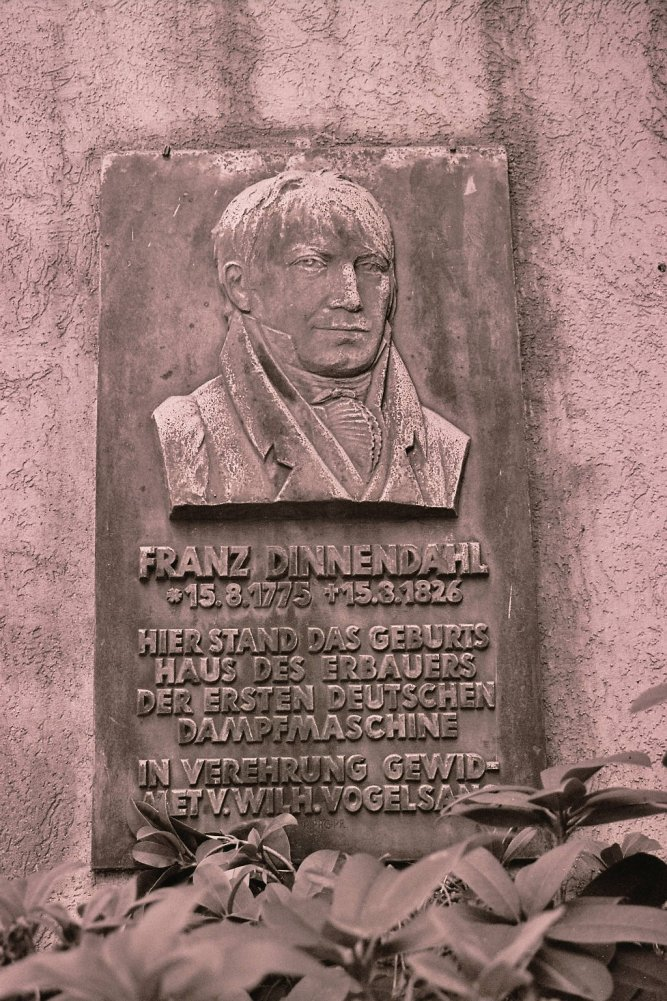
Memorial plaque on the Wasserkraftwerk Horster Mühle

- Essener Beiträge - Beiträge zur Geschichte von Stadt und Stift Essen Band 26. - Essen : Fredebeul & Koenen, 1905, S. 5-52.
