= Alfred Lämmerhirt =

German industrialist and engineer (1839–1899)

- Lämmerhirt c. 1895
- Born: Carl Louis Alfred Traugott Lämmerhirt; 21 April 1839; Stolberg, Kingdom of Prussia (now Germany)
- Died: 10 July 1899 (aged 60); Frankfurt am Main, Kingdom of Prussia
- Resting place: Siepmann family plot, Warstein, North Rhine-Westphalia, Germany; 51.450236°N 8.347556°W
- Education: Karlsruhe Institute of Technology
- Known for: Founding and leading Westfalia Dinnendahl Gröppel
- Spouse: Emilie Louise Schmiedt (m. 1869)
- Children: 8
- Relatives: Hugo Siepmann (son-in-law); Robert Fricke (son-in-law)

Carl Louis Alfred Traugott Lämmerhirt (German pronunciation: [ˈlɛmərˌhɪʁt]; 21 April 1839 – 10 July 1899) was a German industrialist, engineer and founding member of Westfalia Dinnendahl Gröppel, initially based in Bochum. He was the father-in-law of Hugo Siepmann and Robert Fricke.

== Early life and education ==
Lämmerhirt was born 21 April 1839 in Stolberg (Harz), Kingdom of Prussia (presently Germany), the eldest of six children, to Christian Lämmerhirt, a district court secretary and later vice mayor of Suhl, and Karoline Lisette (née Steher). He completed the Real school whilst living with a great-uncle in Nordhausen due to the provincial location of his hometown and limited educational possibilities.

After he completed a technical apprenticeship in Erfurt, he decided to become an engineer. He enrolled and studied mechanical engineering at the Karlsruhe Institute of Technology where he belonged to the Fidelitas fraternity.

== Career ==
After his graduation, he initially worked as stoker/fireman, for the Cologne-Minden Railway Company, followed by employment as engineer for the Bochumer Verein (a large coal and steel concern) in Bochum. In 1872, Lämmerhirt and two other engineers, formed Lämmerhirt, Brandenburg & Co, a mining machinery factory. Due to failing liquidity the company was sold to investors in 1874.

He then initially was an engineer and later general director for Mülheimer Maschinenfabrik und Eisengießerei (English: Mülheim Machinery Factory and Steel Foundry) which would later become Thyssen & Co. By the end of August 1876, Lämmerhirt relocated his family to Winterthur, Switzerland, where he found employment as general director for the Winterthurer Gusswarenfabrik (English: Winterthur Casting Factory), part of Sulzer Brothers. In 1878, the Lämmerhirt family, moved to Berlin for one year where Alfred was employed as an engineer at Roessemann & Kühnemann, a machinery factory. In 1879, they returned to Switzerland. Between 1879 and 1883, he was a lead engineer at Bureau Fritz Marti in Winterthur which was involved in building the Gotthard Tunnel (one of his most notable works).

In 1883, he relocated to Warstein in Westphalia, taking up position as the director for the Warstein mines and smelting association, where he remained until his death in 1899 aged 60.

== Personal life ==
On 7 April 1869, Lämmerhirt married Emilie Louise Schmiedt (1843–1910). They had eight children;

- Carl August Christian (1870–1870)
- Fritz Hugo August, colloquially Fritz (1870–1960), general officer of the Prussian Army, married Emilia Gutschow of Berlin-Wannsee, no issue
- Franz Edgar Rudolph, colloquially Rudolph (1873–1935), vice president at Krupp in Dortmund. He was married to Martha Wenker, likely of the Wenker brewing family.
- Paula Bertha Anna, colloquially Paula (1874–1945)
- Luise Emilie Johanna, colloquially Luise (1876–1962), married Hugo Siepmann, co-owner of Siepmann, in Warstein.
- Emilie Anna Elisabeth, colloquially Emmy (1877–1952), married to Robert Fricke in Bad Harzburg, no issue
- Elisabeth Julie Adolphine, colloquially Else (1881-?)
- Carl Alfred (1882–1890), born in Winterthur, Switzerland, died in Warstein

Lämmerhirt died 10 July 1899 in Frankfurt on Main aged 60 from chest cancer.
