= Fehmarnbelt Lightship =

German lightship

Coordinates: 53°52′9″N 10°40′44″E

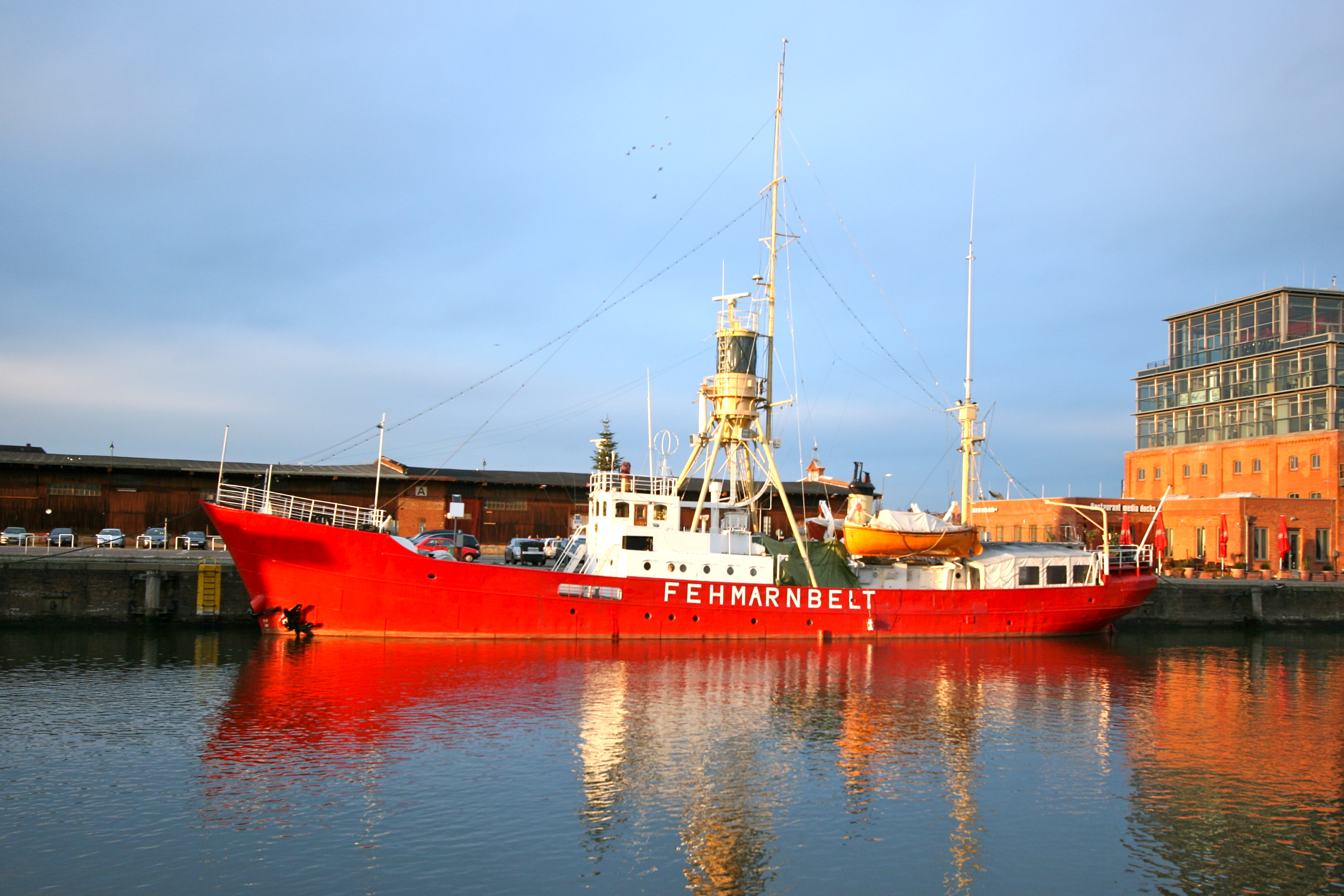
- Fehmarnbelt in the Media Docks on the northern part of the Wall peninsula

History

Germany
- Name: Außeneider (1908-1956); Reserve Holtenau (1956-1965); Fehmarnbelt (1965-present)
- Builder: G.H. Thyen Werft, Brake, Germany
- Cost: 300,000 Reichsmark
- Yard number: S.21
- In service: 1908
- Out of service: 1984
- Home port: Lübeck
- Identification: MMSI number: 211352730; Callsign: DBBD
- Status: Museum ship

General characteristics
- Type: Lightship
- Tonnage: 343 GRT
- Length: 45.44 m (149 ft 1 in) o/a
- Beam: 7.14 m (23 ft 5 in)
- Draught: 3.70 m (12 ft 2 in)
- Depth: 4.70 m (15 ft 5 in)
- Propulsion: 300 hp (224 kW) Klöckner-Humboldt-Deutz 6-cylinder diesel engine
- Speed: 8.6 knots (15.9 km/h; 9.9 mph)
- Crew: 11

The Fehmarnbelt Lightship (German: Feuerschiff Fehmarnbelt) was built in 1906–1908 at Brake on the River Weser and entered service in 1908 as the lightship Außeneider. Until 1945 it was moored at the position known as Außeneider guarding the estuary of the river Eider on the North Sea coast. In the years from 1956 to 1965 it was a reserve lighthouse in the Baltic Sea and then from 1965 to 1984 it was positioned under its present name in the Fehmarn Belt.

Today it belongs to a charitable society and its home port is the Lübeck museum port in the Hanseatic city of Lübeck, where it spends the winter months at least. The ship is preserved in working condition and during the summer it is taken to sea in order to test all facilities under sea conditions. Visits on board the lightship are permitted.

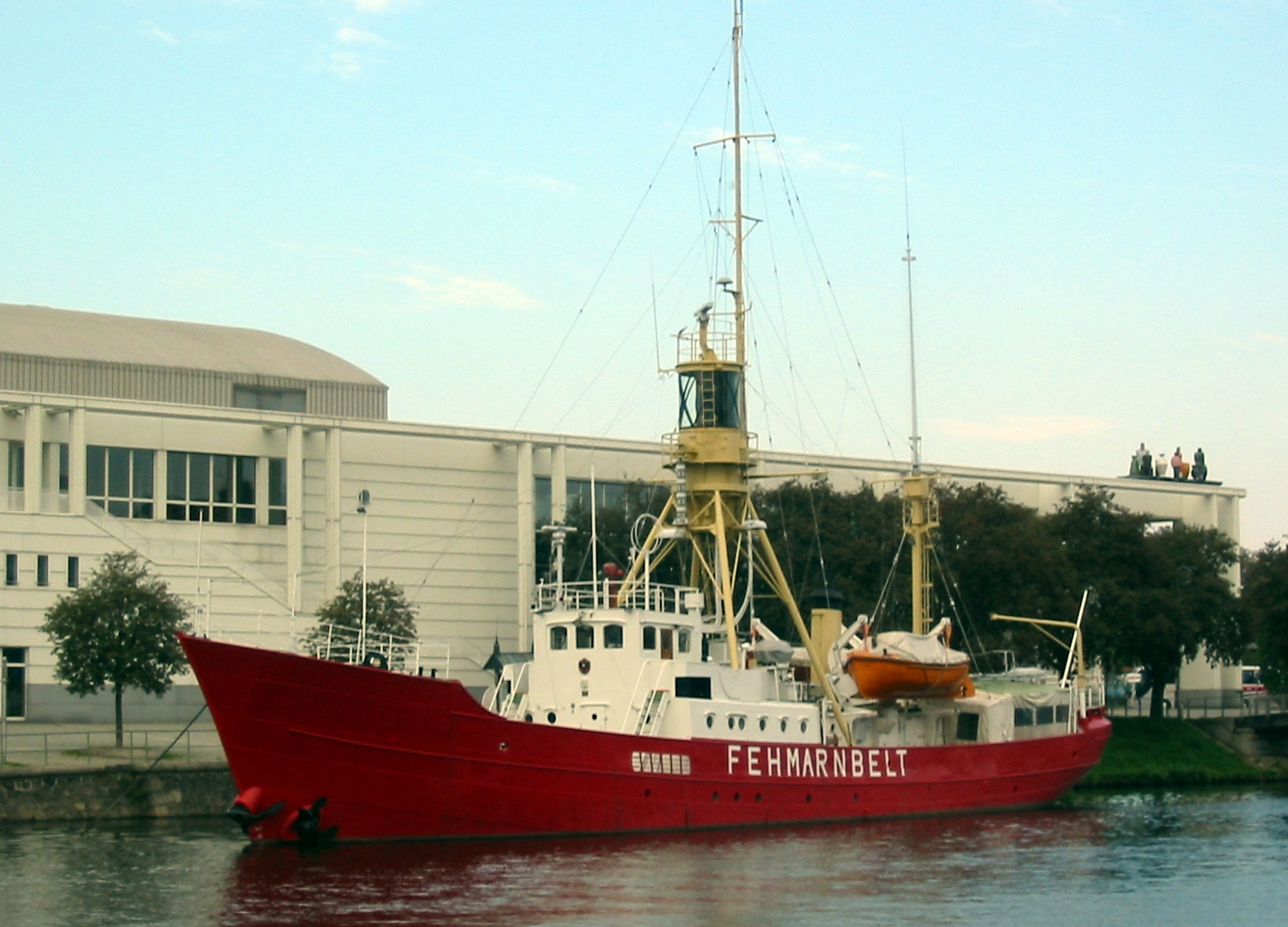
Fehmarnbelt Museum port, Lübeck

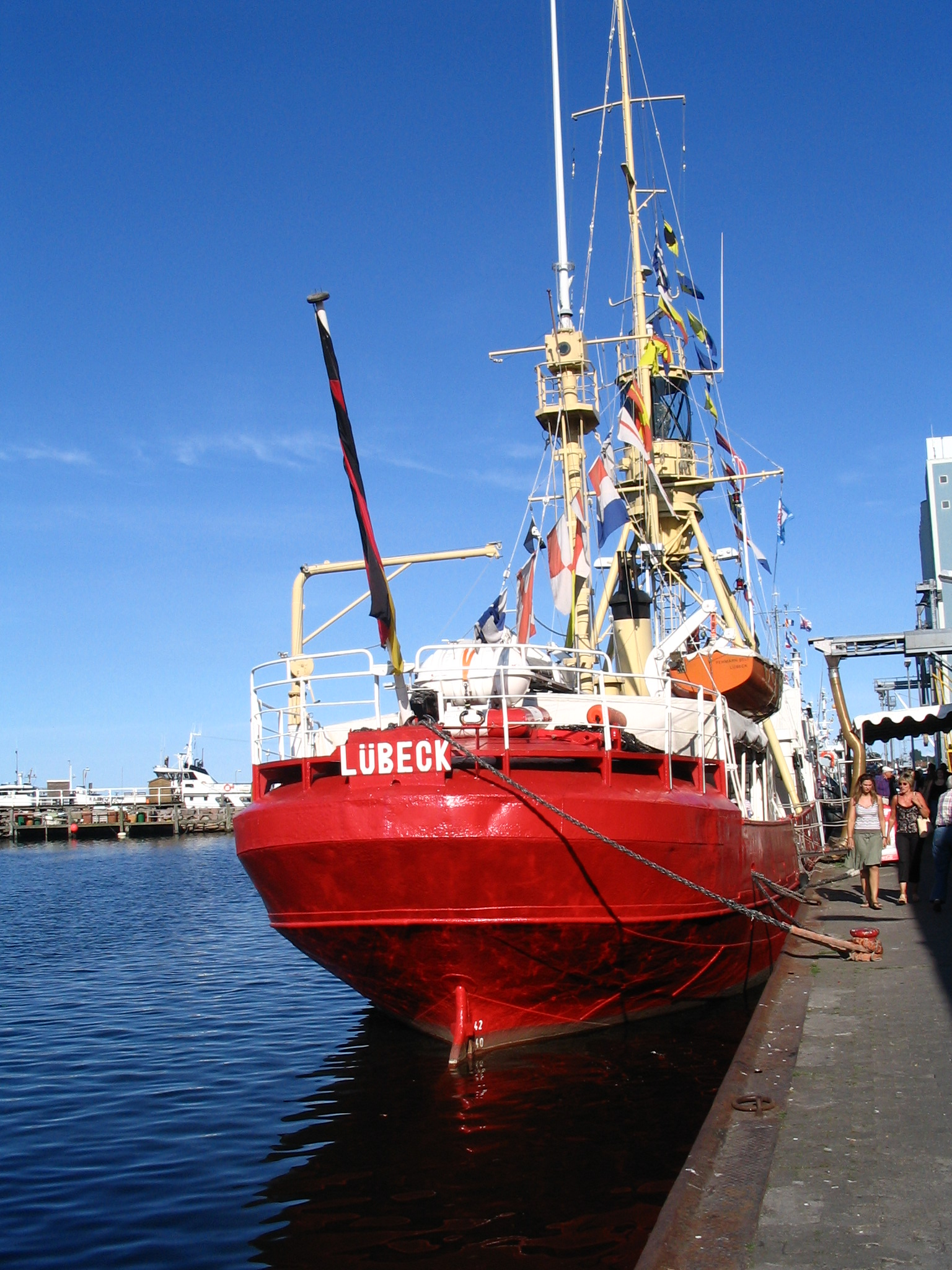
The Fehmarnbelt Lightship in July 2006 visiting the Heiligenhafen port
