= Alfred Siepmann =

German businessman, industrialist and military officer

Alfred Siepmann Dipl.-Kfm.
- Alfred Siepmann c. 1924

Member of the Kreistag of Arnsberg
- In office 1933–1944

Personal details
- Born: Alfred Hugo Heinrich Siepmann; 27 June 1899 Warstein, Kingdom of Prussia, German Empire
- Died: 6 February 1974 (aged 74) Warstein, West Germany
- Party: Nazi Party (1933-44); Christian Democratic Union (after 1944)
- Spouse: Jenny Wilkesmann (m. 1928; div. 1943) Annaliese Bobring (m. 1944)
- Relations: Siepmann family
- Children: 5
- Parent: Hugo Siepmann (father)
- Occupation: Businessman, industrialist, military officer

Military service
- Allegiance: German Empire (until 1933); Nazi Germany (from 1933 to 1945)
- Branch/service: Imperial German Army; Waffen-SS
- Years of service: 1917–1944

Alfred Hugo Heinrich Siepmann (German pronunciation: [ˈalfʁeːt ˈziːpman]; 27 June 1899 – 6 February 1974) was a German businessman, industrialist and military officer of the Waffen-SS during Nazi Germany. Since 1933, he served as a member of the Kreistag of Arnsberg, initially for the Nazi Party and later for the Christian Democratic Union. He was a member of the supervisory boards of Gerling-Konzern and Dresdner Bank. Siepmann was a member of the Siepmann family.

== Early life and education ==
Siepmann was born 27 June 1899 in Warstein, Kingdom of Prussia (presently Germany), the second of three children, to Hugo Siepmann, an industrialist, gentleman farmer and partner in Peters & Co, and Louise Siepmann (née Lämmerhirt), into an Evangelical family.

He was baptized after his maternal grandfather Alfred Lämmerhirt, his father and paternal grandfather. He spent his youth attending schools in Warstein and Lippstadt. His father was a devoted pomologist and retained a leased-out farm in the countryside where he spent part of his youth.

During World War I, he served in the German Imperial Army, where he was promoted to Fahnenjunker Unteroffizier. Between 1919 and 1921 he completed his studies in Economics at Humboldt University of Berlin.

== Personal life ==
On 13 June 1928, Siepmann married Jenny Wilkesmann (1906–1959), a daughter of Ewald Wilkesmann and Hanny (née Rautenbach) of Cologne, Germany. The brides grandfather was the founder of the Rautenbach concern (since 2005 part of Nemak) of Solingen and Wernigerode. They had five children. In 1944, he married secondly to Anneliese Bobring.

== Literature ==
- Dr Felix Rexhausen; Mit dem Blasrohr leben In: Der Spiegel, 1965 (in German)
- Hermann August Ludwig Degener, Walter Habel; Siepmann, Alfred In: The German Who is Who?, 1970 (in German)
