= IHK Arnsberg =

- Industrie- und Handelskammer, Arnsberg, Sauerland-Hellweg

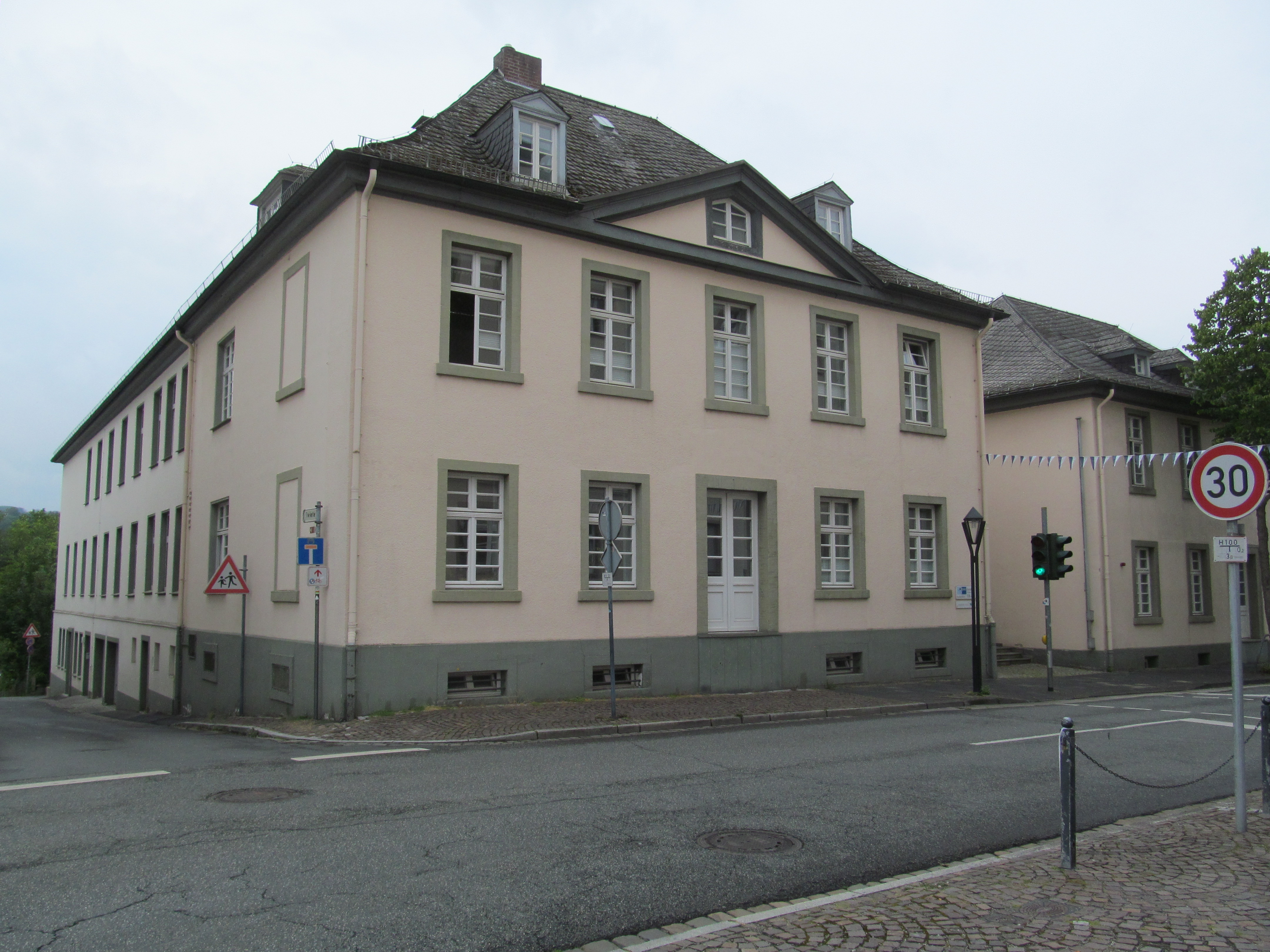
- IHK headquarters in Arnsberg, Germany
- Formation: 10 November 1851; 174 years ago
- Founder: Frederick William IV of Prussia
- Type: business association & advocacy group
- Members: 32,000 (2023)
- Website: Official website

The Industrie- und Handelskammer Arnsberg, Sauerland-Hellweg (English: Chamber of Industry and Commerce, Arnsberg, Sauerland-Hellweg) is one of 80 Chambers of Industry and Commerce in Germany representing collective interests of regional companies in the Hochsauerland Kreis. Founded in 1851, the organization is headquartered in Arnsberg, Germany and counts over 32,000 members.

== Organization ==
Since 24 November 2017 the organization is presided by Andreas Rother who was elected at the general assembly meeting succeeding incumbent Ralf Kersting. The organization is governed by the elected general assembly (Vollversammlung) which consists of 60 representatives.

== History ==
Frederick William IV of Prussia, formed the Chamber of Commerce for the Districts of Arnsberg, Meschede, Brilon and Olpe by decret on 11 June 1851. The constitutional assembly was held on 10 November 1851.

=== Former Presidents ===
- Josef Cosack (1851-1864 and 1876-1877)
- Wilhelm Seel (1865-1875)
- Wilhelm Bergenthal (1878-1884)
- W. Haber (1885-1896)
- Friedrich von Schenck (1897-1911)
- Carl Ewers (1912-1913)
- Adolf Braun (1914-1918)
- Georg Dassel (1919-1932)
- Hugo Siepmann (1933-1938), since 1939 Honorary President
- Fritz Honsel (1939-1944)
- Adolf Cosack (1945-1947)
- Josef Ramesohl (1948-1966)
- Walter Kaiser (1967-1980)
- Alfred Padberg (1980-1988)
- Dieter Henrici (1988-2008)
- Ralf Kersting (2008-2017)
