= Robert Fricke =

German mathematician (1861–1930)

- Fricke c. 1922
- Born: Karl Emanuel Robert Fricke; 24 September 1861; Helmstedt, Kingdom of Hanover
- Died: 18 July 1930 (aged 68); Bad Harzburg, Weimar Republic
- Education: Leipzig University
- Known for: Complex analysis
- Spouses: Eleonore Flender (m. 1894; died 1912) Emilie Anna Luise Lämmerhirt (m. 1925)
- Children: 2
- Scientific career
- Fields: Mathematics
- Workplaces: University of Kiel, University of Göttingen, Braunschweig University of Technology (1894–1930)
- Doctoral advisor: Felix Klein

Karl Emanuel Robert Fricke (24 September 1861 – 18 July 1930) was a German mathematician, known for his work in complex analysis, especially on elliptic, modular and automorphic functions. He was one of the main collaborators of Felix Klein, with whom he produced two classic, two-volume monographs on elliptic modular functions and automorphic functions.

In 1893 in Chicago, his paper Die Theorie der automorphen Functionen und die Arithmetik was read (but not by Fricke) at the International Mathematical Congress held in connection with the World's Columbian Exposition. From 1894 to 1930 Fricke was professor of Higher Mathematics at the Technische Hochschule Carolo-Wilhelmina in Braunschweig.

== Personal life ==
On 4 August 1894, Fricke married Eleonore Flender (1873-1912), daughter of Hermann August Flender and Aline Flender (née Klein) in Düsseldorf. She was a niece of Felix Klein with whom he worked. They had two children;

- Gertrud Fricke (1895-1975)
- Paul Fricke (1896-1961)

His wife died in 1912 aged 49. On 7 March 1925, aged 64, he remarried to Emilie Anna Elise colloquially known as Emmy (1877-1952). She was the seventh of nine children of Alfred Lämmerhirt. They had no children.

Fricke died on 18 July 1930 in Bad Harzburg aged 68.

== See also ==
- Fricke involution
- Leonardo polyhedron

== Bibliography ==
- Fricke, Robert; Klein, Felix (1890), Vorlesungen über die Theorie der elliptischen Modulfunctionen (Volume 1), B. G. Teubner, Leipzig, archived from the original on March 3, 2016
- Fricke, Robert; Klein, Felix (1892), Vorlesungen über die Theorie der elliptischen Modulfunctionen (Volume 2), B. G. Teubner, Leipzig
- Fricke, Robert; Klein, Felix (1897), Vorlesungen über die Theorie der automorphen Functionen. Erster Band; Die gruppentheoretischen Grundlagen. (in German), Leipzig: B. G. Teubner, ISBN 978-1-4297-0551-6, JFM 28.0334.01
- Fricke, Robert; Klein, Felix (1912), Vorlesungen über die Theorie der automorphen Functionen. Zweiter Band: Die funktionentheoretischen Ausführungen und die Anwendungen. (in German), Leipzig: B. G. Teubner., ISBN 978-1-4297-0552-3, JFM 32.0430.01
- Fricke, Robert (1915), Die elliptischen Funktionen und ihre Anwendungen. Erster Band: Die funktionentheoretischen und analytischen Grundlagen (in German), B. G. Teubner; Reprint, Springer Verlag, 2011, ISBN 978-3642195563
- Fricke, Robert (1922), Die elliptischen Funktionen und ihre Anwendungen. Zweiter Band: Die algebraischen Ausführungen (in German), B. G. Teubner; Reprint, Springer Verlag, 2011, ISBN 978-3642195600
- Fricke, Robert (2012), Die elliptischen Funktionen und ihre Anwendungen. Dritter Band: Anwendungen (in German), Springer Verlag, ISBN 9783642209536
