= Matthias Kleiner =

German engineer and professor

Matthias Kleiner PhD
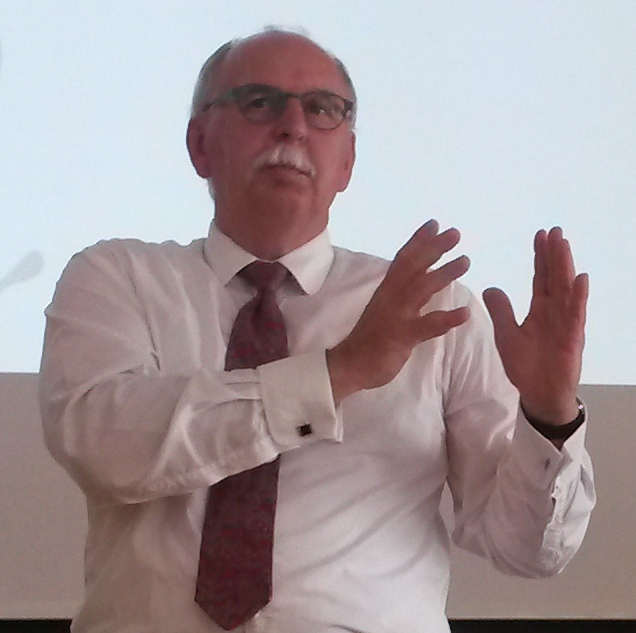
- Kleiner in 2014
- Born: Matthias Kleiner; 24 May 1955 (age 71); Recklinghausen, West Germany
- Citizenship: Germany
- Occupations: Engineer, professor and advisor
- Spouse: Christine Burckhardt
- Children: 5
- Awards: Leibniz Prize
- Honours: Order of Merit of the Federal Republic of Germany, Honorary doctorate of Leuphana University of Lüneburg

Matthias Kleiner (born 24 May 1955) is a German engineer and professor for forming technology at Technical University Dortmund. He served as president of the Leibniz Association from 2014 to 2022 and as president of the German Research Foundation from 2007 to 2012, where he played an instrumental role in a number of international and interdisciplinary research projects. Kleiner currently serves as advisor to industrial companies such as on the board of advisors of Siepmann. He is the recipient of a Leibniz Prize.

== Early life and education ==
Kleiner was born on 24 May 1955 in Dortmund, Germany. He completed his Abitur in 1974 at Geschwister-Scholl-Gymnasium and studied mechanical engineering at Technical University Dortmund from 1974 to 1982. Until 1987, he worked as scientific assistant, at the institute for forming technology while completing his PhD.

== Career ==
Between 1994 and 1998, Kleiner served as C4-professor at the newly founded Brandenburg Technical University in Cottbus and was also a member of the founding rectorate. Since 1998, he works as professor for forming technology at the Technical University Dortmund and since 2004 as head of the Institute for Forming Technology. Between 2000 and 2002, he was the dean at the mechanical engineering faculty.

From July 2005 to December 2006, Kleiner served as vice-chair and from January 2007 to December 2012 as chair (president) of the German Research Foundation succeeding Ernst-Ludwig Winnacker. In July 2014 he succeeded Karl Ulrich Mayer as president of the Leibniz Association. In 2022, he resigned and Martina Brockmeier took-over his position. Kleiner is a member in various academic and scientific organizations which include; acatech, German National Academy of Sciences Leopoldina (since 2006) and Academia Europea. Since 2015, he serves as an executive director of the university board of Goethe-University in Frankfurt am Main.

He is also a member of several advisory boards such as Siepmann or the Werner Siemens Foundation.

== Personal life ==
Kleiner is married to pastor Christine Burkhardt Kleiner and has five children.

== Literature ==
=== Author ===
- Dynamisches Beulverhalten neuartiger Feinblechwerkstoffe, EFB Hannover, 1998 (in German)
- Der Einsatz von Mehrprofessor-Steuerungen in der Umformtechnik am Beispiel des Walzrundens, VDI Publishers, Düsseldorf, 1987 (ISBN 3-18-142902-3 (dissertation) (in German)

=== Publisher ===
- Flexible manufacture of lightweight frame structures; Trans Tech, Zürich 2006 (ISBN 978-0-87849-403-3), co-authors; Jürgen Fleischer, Marco Schickorra and Michael Zäh
- Umformtechnik: Ideen, Konzepte, Entwicklungen; Festschrift zum 60. Geburtstag für Prof. Dr.-Ing. Eberhard von Finckenstein, Teubner Publishers, Stuttgart, 1992 (ISBN 3-519-06345-X) (in German)

== Awards ==
- Leibniz Prize (1997)
- Order of Merit of the Federal Republic of Germany (2010)
- Honorary Doctorate of Leuphana University of Lüneburg (2021)
