= Leonardo polyhedron =

Type of polyhedron with many holes

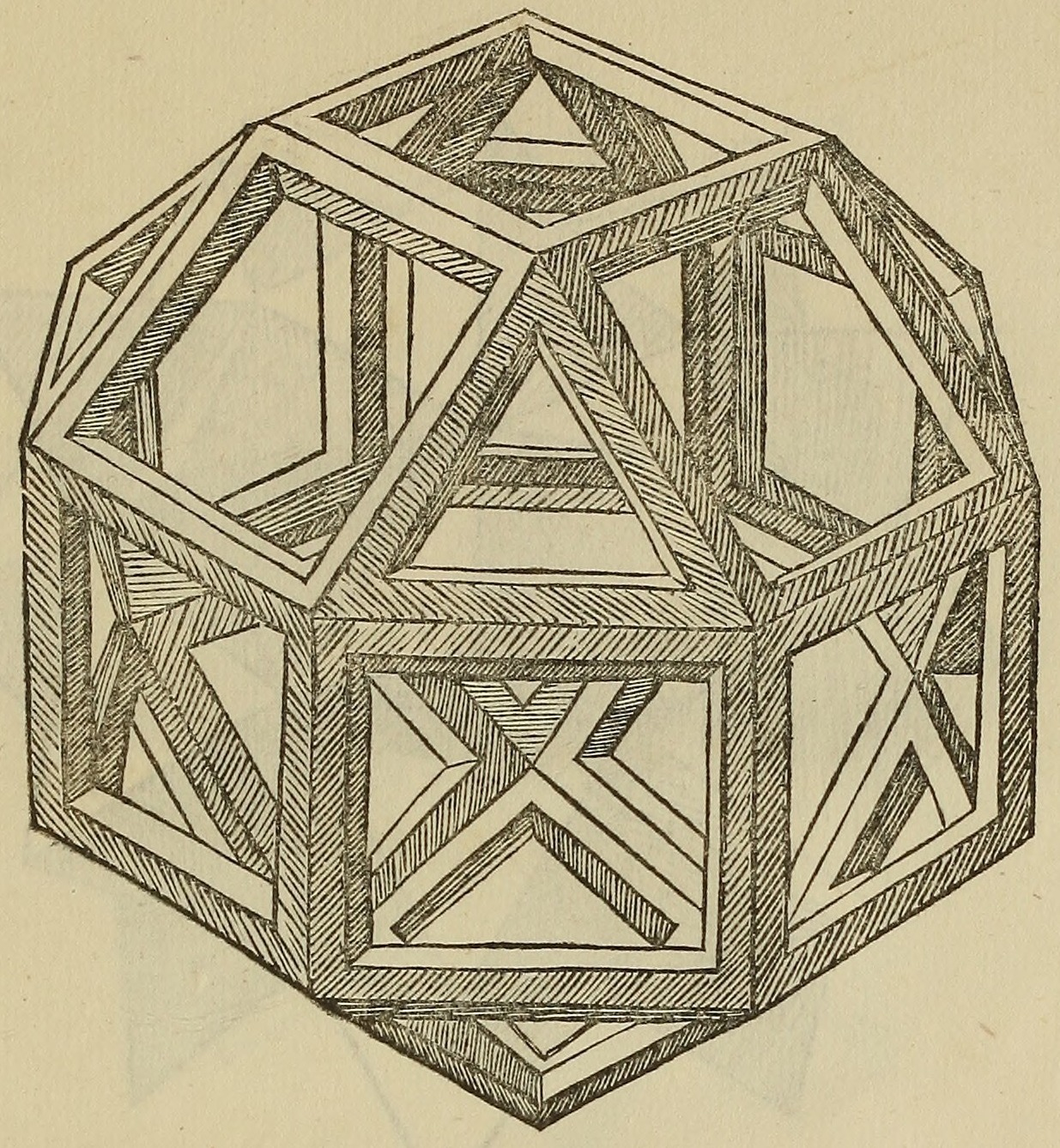
Rhombicuboctahedron, one of the Leonardo da Vinci's geometrical shapes illustration in 1509 Divina proportione

A Leonardo polyhedron is a polyhedron with a Platonic solid's rotational symmetry and genus $g \ge 2$. Here, a polyhedron is the unbounded 2-manifold embedded in three-dimensional Euclidean space. The polyhedron is named after Leonardo da Vinci, who illustrated geometrical shapes in Luca Pacioli's De divina proportione in three phases: drawing Platonic solids and Archimedean solids; replacing the edges of those solids by struts, forming a convex polygon, and this results in the first polyhedron with many genera; and placing each hole with the skeleton of a pyramid.

Alicia Boole Stott discovered the first regular Leonardo polyhedron (its property has transitivity by the set consisting of vertex, edge, and face of a polyhedron). Similar to Leonardo's work, she began the construction with a four-dimensional polytope, projecting to a Schlegel diagram, and replacing its edges with quadrilateral-shaped struts. Coxeter later discovered the regular skew polyhedron. Felix Klein discovered the three genera. Together with Robert Fricke, they found the five genera of Leonardo polyhedra. Some colleagues further discovered the locally regular and the genus up to 14.
