= Karl-Werner Schulte =

German academic

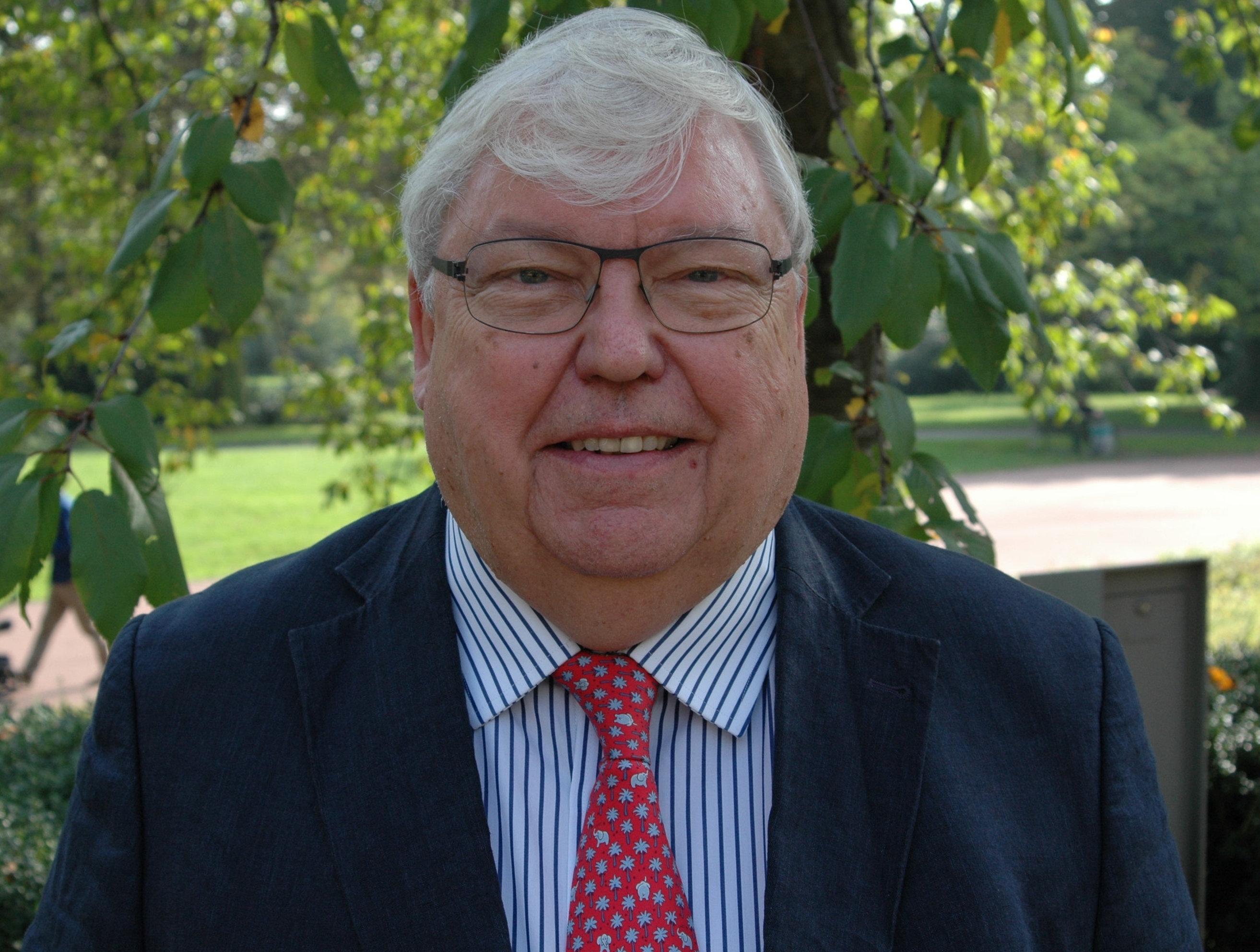
Karl-Werner Schulte in 2014

Karl-Werner Schulte (born 8 June 1946 in Warstein, North Rhine-Westphalia, Germany) is a German Professor of Real Estate at the IREBS International Real Estate Business School, University of Regensburg and was the Founder and Academic Director of the IREBS Real Estate Academy, formerly the EBS Real Estate Academy.

== Life ==
Schulte studied Business Administration at the University of Muenster and graduated 1970 as a "Diplom-Kaufmann" (MBA or MSc Business equivalent). In 1974, he was awarded a Doctoral Degree (Dr. rer.pol.) and promoted to Senior Lecturer. A few years later, he became a Reader at the University of Muenster. In 1986, he was appointed Professor of Investment & Finance at the EBS European Business School, located near Frankfurt.

In 1990 Karl-Werner Schulte and his wife Dr. Gisela Schulte-Daxbök founded the EBS Real Estate Academy, Germany's first institution to offer executive education for real estate practitioners. Schulte was its academic director for about 15 years. In 1992, the executive part time course in Real Estate became the first course which the RICS Royal Institution of Chartered Surveyors accredited in Continental Europe.

In 1994, he raised funds from leading real estate firms in Europe for an Endowed Chair of Real Estate, which he took over. He established real estate as a major in the "Diplom-Kaufmann" degree course, making it the first such course with this specification worldwide, and received RICS accreditation. With the appointment of more professors, the Department of Real Estate was established, which he led for several years.

In 2006, the Department of Real Estate (nearly all professors and donors) and the Real Estate Academy moved to the University of Regensburg where Karl-Werner Schulte initiated the IREBS International Real Estate Business School and became the holder of the ECE Endowed Professorship and the Academic Director of the IREBS Real Estate Academy. When he retired in 2011 the IREBS International Real Estate Business School had developed into one of the leading academic real estate centers worldwide.

Karl-Werner Schulte still plays an active role in real estate education and research at IREBS. He is the Founder and Academic Director of the Center for African Real Estate Research and the co-founder and chairman of the Board of Trustees of the homonymous non-profit Foundation (www.afrer.org) which supports doctoral and master students as well as the development of real estate departments at universities in African countries. The research center and the foundation collaborate with the African Real Estate Society which is part of the IRES International Real Estate Society network.

On the occasion of his 70th birthday in 2016, the European Real Estate Society (ERES) held its Annual Conference at the University of Regensburg and the International Real Estate Business School (IREBS) honoured him with the symposium "Real Estate Research & Practice - Past, Present and Future".

== Role in the Real Estate Industry ==
Schulte is founder or co-founder of some organizations of the real estate industry:

- GIF Society of Property Researchers, Germany - ERES European Real Estate Society - ULI Urban Land Institute German Chapter - IPD Germany, formerly DID German Property Databank, today part of MSCI - ICG Initiative Corporate Governance of the German Real Industry - WVFI Scientific Society for the Promotion of Real Estate Journalism Furthermore, he worked as consultant and served in supervisory boards and advisory boards of well-known real estate companies and organizations. He was the first German to be elected Honorary Member of the RICS Royal Institution of Chartered Surveyors and Member of CRE Counselors of Real Estate.

== Functions in Academic Organizations ==
- Founding President of GIF Society of Property Researchers, Germany
- President of the ERES European Real Estate Society
- President of the IRES International Real Estate Society
- Board Member of the AfRES African Real Estate Society

He has been Editor of the "Zeitschrift für Immobilienökonomie" (now "German Journal of Real Estate Research") published by GIF, for nearly a decade and was or still is Member of the editorial board of several international academic real estate journals.

== PhD Graduates in Professor Positions ==
Karl-Werner Schulte has supervised around 75 PhD students seventeen of which have been appointed Professors at German Universities:

- Jenny Arens, Duale Hochschule Baden-Württemberg
- Stephan Bone-Winkel, Universität Regensburg
- Petra Brockhoff, Universität Duisburg-Essen
- Christian Focke, Hochschule Aschaffenburg
- Michael Hauer, Hochschule Amberg-Weiden
- Kerstin H. Hennig, EBS Universität für Wirtschaft und Recht
- Gerrit Leopoldsberger, Hochschule für Wirtschaft und Umwelt Nürtingen-Geislingen
- Ulrich Nack, EBZ Business School
- Andrea Pelzeter, Hochschule für Wirtschaft und Recht Berlin
- Jeannette Raethel, Hochschule für Wirtschaft und Recht Berlin
- Verena Rock, Hochschule Aschaffenburg
- Nico B. Rottke, EBS Universität für Wirtschaft und Recht
- Wolfgang Schäfers, Universität Regensburg
- Peter Schaubach, EBS Universität für Wirtschaft und Recht
- Ramon Sotelo, Bauhaus-Universität Weimar
- Matthias Thomas, EBS Universität für Wirtschaft und Recht
- Rolf Tilmes, EBS Universität für Wirtschaft und Recht

== Awards ==
Karl-Werner Schulte received numerous awards. He is the only person to have received all three IRES Awards during his lifetime.

- 1999: International Real Estate Society (IRES) Service Award
- 2001: European Real Estate Society (ERES) Achievement Award
- 2005: Award of Excellence des German Council of Shopping Centers e.V.
- 2008: ULI Germany Leadership Award
- 2009: Immobilienmanager Lifetime Award
- 2011: Pioneer Award, American Real Estate Society (ARES)
- 2011: American Real Estate Society (ARES) Pioneer Award
- 2011: Auszeichnung „Köpfe 2011“ des Fachmagazins Immobilienwirtschaft als einer von zwölf Managern der Immobilienwirtschaft
- 2013: International Real Estate Society (IRES) Corporate Leadership Award for the IREBS Foundation for African Real Estate Research
- 2013: ERES Honorary Membership
- 2015: Chief of the African Real Estate Society (AfRES)
- 2016: International Real Estate Society (IRES) Achievement Award
- 2016: IRES Special Recognition Award
- 2023: African Real Estate Society (AfRES) Corporate Leadership Award for the IREBS Foundation for African Real Estate Research
- 2024: Award „One out of 10 German African Think-Tanks“, Table.Africa Professional Briefings
- 2024: European Real Estate Society (ERES) Service Award

The University of Regensburg awarded him the dignity of an honorary member, the highest honor that the University of Regensburg can bestow.

== Honorary Memberships ==
Furthermore, Karl-Werner Schulte was appointed Honorary Member by Institutions, Organizations and Societies:

- RICS Royal Institution of Chartered Surveyors (HonRICS)
- FPSB Financial Planning Standards Board (HonCFP)
- Alumni Organizations IMMOEBS and IREBSCORE
- GIF Society of Property Researchers, Germany
- ERES European Real Estate Society
- AfRES African Real Estate Society
- Alumni Ardhi University, Tanzania
- University of Regensburg .

== Publications ==
Karl-Werner Schulte authored and edited more than 20 monographs, mostly in German language and has written numerous articles in academic and practitioners' journals. Only his most important authorships and editorships in English language are cited here.

=== As an author ===
- Karl-Werner Schulte: Optimale Nutzungsdauer und optimaler Ersatzzeitpunkt bei Entnahmemaximierung. Schriften zur wirtschaftswissenschaftlichen Forschung. Band 89. Anton Hain Verlag, Meisenheim 1975. ISBN 3-445-01215-6 (Zugleich Münster, Dissertationsschrift).
- Karl-Werner Schulte: Wirtschaftlichkeitsrechnung. Physica-Verlag, 1. Auflage Würzburg 1978. ISBN 3-7908-0202-6.; 4. Auflage 1986. ISBN 978-3-642-61653-2.
- Karl-Werner Schulte: Aktienrechtliche Rechnungslegung im Spiegel der Geschäftsberichte, Physica-Verlag, Würzburg 1984.
- Karl-Werner Schulte: Bilanzpolitik und Publizitätsverhalten deutscher Aktiengesellschaften - Derzeitige Praxis und erwartete Auswirkungen des Bilanzrichtlinien-Gesetzes, Verlag Eul, Bergisch Gladbach 1986.

=== As an editor ===
- Immobilienökonomie
  - Bd. 1: Betriebswirtschaftliche Grundlagen. 5. Aufl. De Gruyter Oldenbourg, Berlin/Boston 2016, ISBN 978-3-486-71255-1.(die 5. Auflage zusammen mit Stephan Bone-Winkel und Wolfgang Schäfers).
  - Bd. 2: Rechtliche Grundlagen. 3. Aufl. Oldenbourg, München 2013, ISBN 978-3-486-71359-6.
  - Bd. 3: Stadtplanerische Grundlagen. 2. Aufl. Oldenbourg, München 2012, ISBN 978-3-486-59754-7.
  - Bd. 4: Volkswirtschaftliche Grundlagen. Oldenbourg, München 2008, ISBN 978-3-486-58281-9.
- Real Estate Education Throughout the World. Past, Present and Future. Sponsored by EBS and ARES. Kluwer, Boston 2002, ISBN 0-7923-7553-X (Nachdruck 2013).
