= Wilhelm Bergenthal =

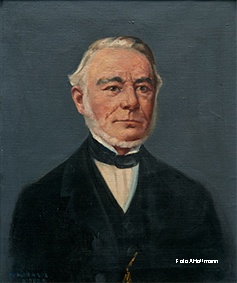
- Bergenthal c. 1870

Personal details
- Born: Franz Anton Wilhelm Bergenthal; February 4, 1805; Warstein, Holy Roman Empire
- Died: April 28, 1893 (aged 88); Warstein, Kingdom of Prussia
- Occupation: Industrialist, politician, founder of Bergenthal & Gabriel

Franz Anton Wilhelm Bergenthal colloquially Wilhelm Bergenthal (4 February 1805 - 28 April 1893) was a German industrialist and politician. In 1834, he formed Bergenthal & Gabriel, a predecessor of Siepmann in Warstein. Additionally he served as president of IHK Arnsberg from 1878 to 1884.

Bergenthal unsuccessfully sought election to the Reichstag (North German Confederation) in March 1867 but lost election against Peter Reichensperger. He campaigned for seats in the 1878 German federal election and in a by-election to the Prussian House of Representatives in 1884, both times unsuccessfully.
