= Dassel family =

German noble family

House of Dassel Grafen von Dassel
- Patrician dynasty
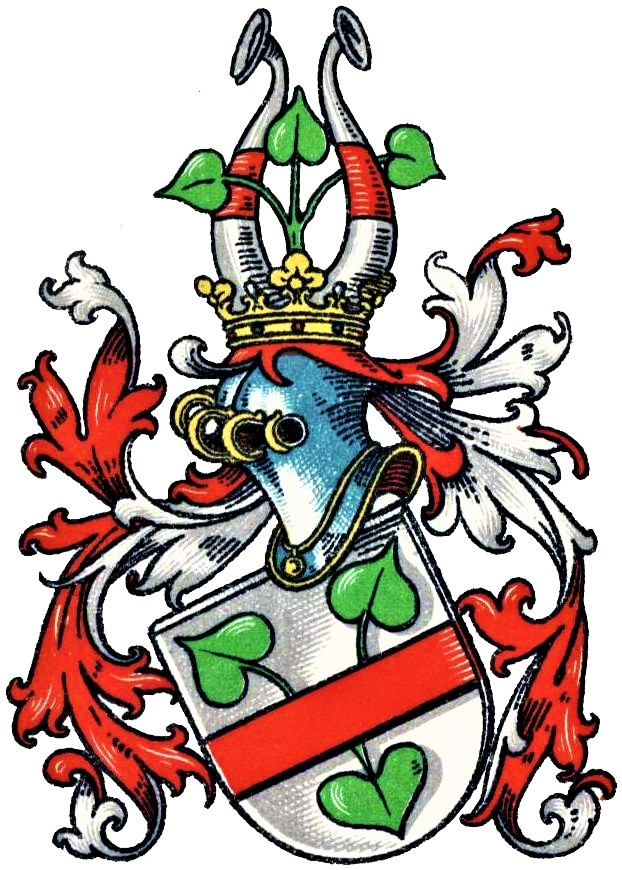
- Country: Holy Roman Empire; German Confederation; German Empire
- Current region: Germany, United States, Canada
- Founded: 13th century
- Founder: Hermanus de Dasle

The Dassel family alternatively House of Dassel or Dassel-Wellersen (until 20th century) is a Patrician noble family from Lower Saxony, which is named after the Town of Dassel, formerly seat of the Dukes of Dassel (Grafen von Dassel). There are several offsprings of the lineage which originates in the 13th century. The most prominent is an extinct line in Lüneburg.

More recent offsprings include Georg Dassel who built the Dassel Mansion in Allagen. Bernhard Dassel (1850-1886), a serial businessman and acquaintance of James J. Hill, who was born in New York to German parents, was the founder and namesake of Dassel, Minnesota.

== History ==
The family first appears in documents around 1230 with Hermannus de Dasle in the entourage of the Counts of Dassel. On 29 July 1348 Mechthildis, the daughter of the knight Hermann von Dasle, is mentioned in a document. In the 14th and 15th centuries, the von Dassel family acquired extensive fiefdoms and allodial estates in the area around Einbeck.

The uninterrupted family line begins with the citizen of Einbeck, Hermannus de Dasle, who is named as a buyer in Hoppensen in 1359. The family built a large town house in Einbeck in 1600, the previous building, built in 1317, burned down in 1540. Family members lived in this stone house for several generations. It was sold in 1803 by forest master Friedrich Thedel von Dassel († 1837), Maire in Rotenkirchen, to a merchant named Krome. In the backyard of the house, the merchant's sons ran a weaving mill from 1866. After a technical defect, the weaving mill and the house burned down in 1906. The Lüneburg Line achieved financial success through activities at the Lüneburg Saline and thus gained political influence. She owned a large patrician house and was extinct in the 19th century. In addition, a branch of the von Dassel family was temporarily based in Riga, Latvia, where their coat of arms was preserved on a showpiece from 1676 in the silver treasure of the Blackheads. On 30 November 1872, Prussian approval for the Dassel-Wellersen name was issued.

== Coat of arms ==
The family coat of arms shows a red bar in silver in front of three green linden leaves placed in a cross of thieves. On the helmet with red and silver covers a growing three-leaf linden branch between two silver buffalo horns, each with a red bar.

== Members ==
- Georg Dassel (1852–1934), businessman and manufacturer, owner of Dassel Mansion

== Literature ==
- Mittheilungen an die Mitglieder der Familie von Dassel. Familienzeitung, Chemnitz, Nr. 1.1889(1892)-3.1891. Digitalisat (in German)
- Bericht über das Geschlecht von Dassel. Familienzeitung, Chemnitz, Nr. 4.1892(1893)-9.1899. Digitalisat (in German)
- Deutsche Adelsgenossenschaft (Hrsg.): Jahrbuch des Deutschen Adels, Band 3, 1899, Verlag von W. T. Bruer, S. 100. (Digitalisat) und S. 112. (Digitalisat) (in German)
- Gothaisches Genealogisches Taschenbuch der Adeligen Häuser Teil A, 1. Jg., Justus Perthes, Gotha 1900, S. 212ff; 33. Jg., 1934, S. 161. (in German)
- Genealogisches Handbuch des Adels, Adelslexikon. Band II, Band 58 der Gesamtreihe, S. 423, C. A. Starke Verlag, Limburg (Lahn) 1974. (in German)
- Ernst Voß: Das Lüneburger Inventarverzeichnis der Familie von Dassel. Einbecker Jahrbuch, Band 39, 1988, S. 111–128. (in German)
- Ernst Voß: Das Steinerne Haus. Einbecker Jahrbuch 46, 1999, S. 5–42. (in German)
