= Dassel Mansion =

- Haus Dassel
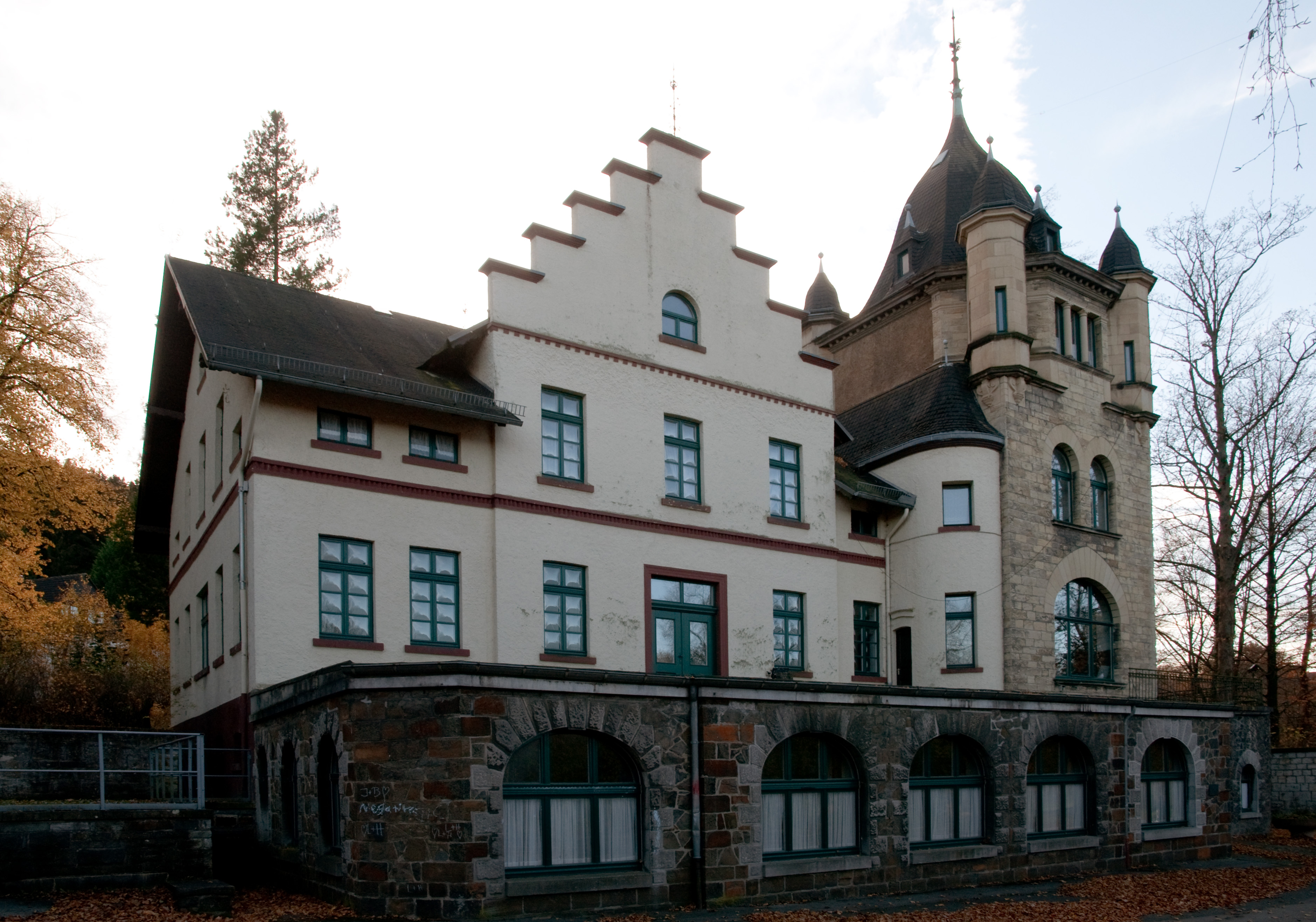

- Location within Germany

General information
- Type: Villa
- Location: Viktor-Röper-Straße 2, Warstein
- Coordinates: 51°28′53″N 8°15′27″E
- Groundbreaking: 1841
- Renovated: 1887
- Client: Victor Röper
- Owner: Georg Dassel (1887–1934); Dassel family (1934–1972); Town of Warstein (1972–present)

The Dassel Mansion (German: Haus Dassel) is a 19th-century mansion in Allagen, now part of Warstein, Germany. It was commissioned by quarry owner and manufacturer Victor Röper as his main residence and the office building for his companies. After he declared bankruptcy it was taken over by Georg Dassel, an offspring of the noble von Dassel family. The building currently is operating as a landmarked museum.

== History ==
According to local historian Ferdinand Ferber, the house was commissioned by Victor Röper around 1841. However, it cannot be determined due to lack of documentation, when each of today's elements came into place and the history of several architectural features disputable.

In 1900, under the ownership of Georg Dassel, the house received the tower and added several more representative features.

In 1972, the mansion was sold to the then independent municipality Allagen (today part of Warstein).

Since November 24, 1984, it is historically protected as a landmark of the city.
