= KHD Humboldt Wedag =

German engineering company

- Type: Publicly traded
- Traded as: FWB: KWG
- Industry: Engineering
- Founded: 1856
- Headquarters: Cologne, Germany
- Key people: Hubert Keusch(Chairman), Juergen Luckas (CFO), Yizhen “Mario” Zhu (EVP), Daniel Uttelbach, Sales & Technology (EVP)
- Products: Machinery, systems and services for the cement industry
- Services: Plant Services, Spare parts, Process Engineering, Project Management
- Number of employees: 750 employees
- Website: khd.com

KHD Humboldt Wedag is an engineering company that supplies machinery, parts, and services, including process engineering and project management to the global cement industry. The holding company KHD Humboldt Wedag International AG, based in Cologne, Germany employs more than 750 employees worldwide, including customer service centers in the Americas, India, Russia, and the Asia-Pacific region.

KHD Humboldt Wedag International AG is listed on the Frankfurt Stock Exchange.

== History ==
In 1856, Hermann Sievers, Wimmar Breuer and Martin Neuerburg formed a general partnership, under the name of Maschinenfabrik von Sievers & Co Humboldt Wedag AG, formed in 1859 was formerly the industrial plant arm of Deutz AG.

In 1871, the company changed its name to Maschinenbau Anstalt Humboldt in honor of the famous German Scientist Alexander von Humboldt. In December 1924, under the direction of Peter Klöckner, the company entered into a cooperative agreement with Motorenfabrik Deutz AG which would later become Humboldt-Deutz-Motoren AG. Peter Klöckner secured approximately 78% of the capital of Humboldt-Deutz-Motoren AG and an agreement was made to bind the company firmly to Klöckner Werke AG, as a subsidiary. In 1938, after a deal with Klöckner Werke AG, the company changed their name to Klöckner Humboldt Deutz AG.

In the spring of 1969, the plant construction division was extended through the acquisition of a majority holding in Westfalia Dinnendahl Gröppel AG (Wedag) of Bochum. Further in 1972, Wedag and Humboldt merged to become KHD Industrieanlagen AG.

In 1988, after economic problems caused by misjudgments and bad investments combined with an unfavorable economic climate, the KHD group began a radical restructuring based on strategic business units, with KHD AG continuing to operate as a managing holding company. The group began showing a profit in 1989.

In 1993, KHD Humboldt Wedag acquired ZAB Zementanlagen und Maschinenbau GmbH.

Later in 2005 the company was acquired by MFC Bancorp; after its successful recovery, the holding company itself changed its name to KHD Humboldt Wedag International Ltd.

In 2009, KHD Humboldt Wedag divested its two subsidiaries, MBE Coal & Minerals Technology and MBE Cologne Engineering, to concentrate on cement.

In 2010, the company split into Terra Nova and KHD Humboldt Wedag International AG.

In February 2011, KHD and AVIC Beijing Co. Ltd signed a strategic partnership agreement.

In April 2013, KHD signed an exclusive and perpetual license agreement with Weir Minerals for HPGR (high pressure grinding rolls) technology. KHD would receive royalty payment on equipment sales.

In Sept 2013, AVIC International Beijing Limited bid to acquire further 19.03% of shares in KHD Humboldt Wedag International AG. On the completion of these transactions, AVIC will hold total 39.03% of the shares in KHD.

In Dec 2013, a joint statement by the management and supervisory Board said they welcome AVIC's aim to continue its support of KHD's current growth strategy and to maintain the commercial identity of the KHD Group.

== Business concept ==
Apart from process engineering and project management, the company's products are classified into grinding technology, burning technology and process automation. The company also has a centralized test center in Cologne and a dedicated spare parts and plant services division.
