= Chest cancer =

Chest cancer is cancer anywhere in the chest.

Chest cancer may also refer to:

- Lung cancer, the most common form of cancer in the chest
- A euphemism for male breast cancer
