= Wilhelm Herchenbach =

German writer (1818–1889)

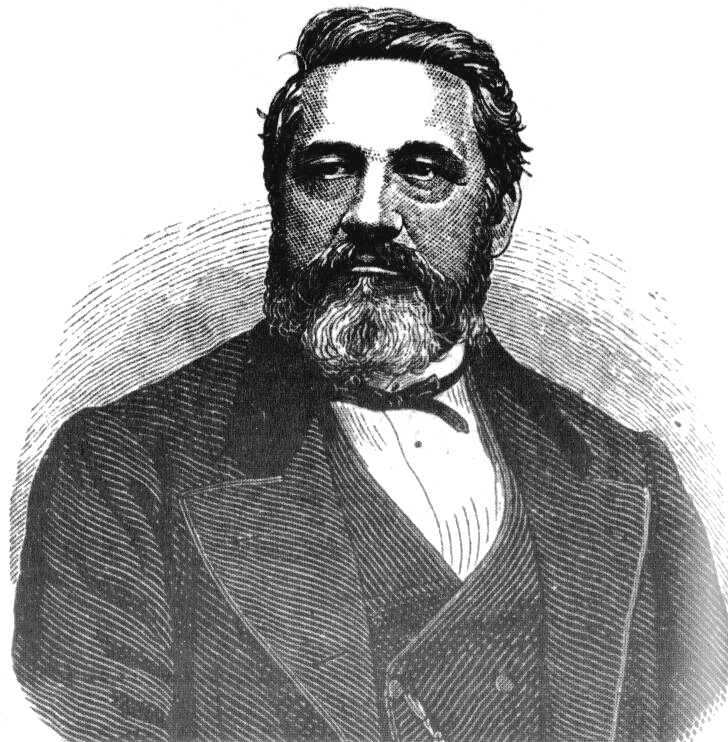
Wilhelm Herchenbach

Wilhelm Herchenbach (November 13, 1818, in Neunkirchen, – December 14, 1889, in Düsseldorf) was a 19th-century German author.

Having attended school in Neunkirchen, Wilhelm Herchenbach decided to become a teacher himself. He taught in the town of Düsseldorf, where he also founded his own boys' school in 1850.

In between 1852 and 1854 Wilhelm became the private teacher of Stephanie of Hohenzollern (the daughter of Prince Karl Anton of Hohenzollern-Sigmaringen), the future queen of Portugal; he also taught the kids of Robert and Clara Schumann, while their parents were touring in Europe.

From 1868 onwards, Wilhelm Herchenbach focused on writing, and by the time of his death in 1889, his works comprised over 300 books. Most books were renarrations of local folk tales or told stories of his own imagination and were usually targeted at young readers, centering around issues of (Christian) morality. But Wilhelm also wrote novels with an historical background, travelogues and books of educational intent. His works once had a quite high circulation and were translated into several other languages (like English, French, Dutch etc.). Publication of the books ceased in the 1930s.
