= Siepmann =

German notable family

Siepmann Industries

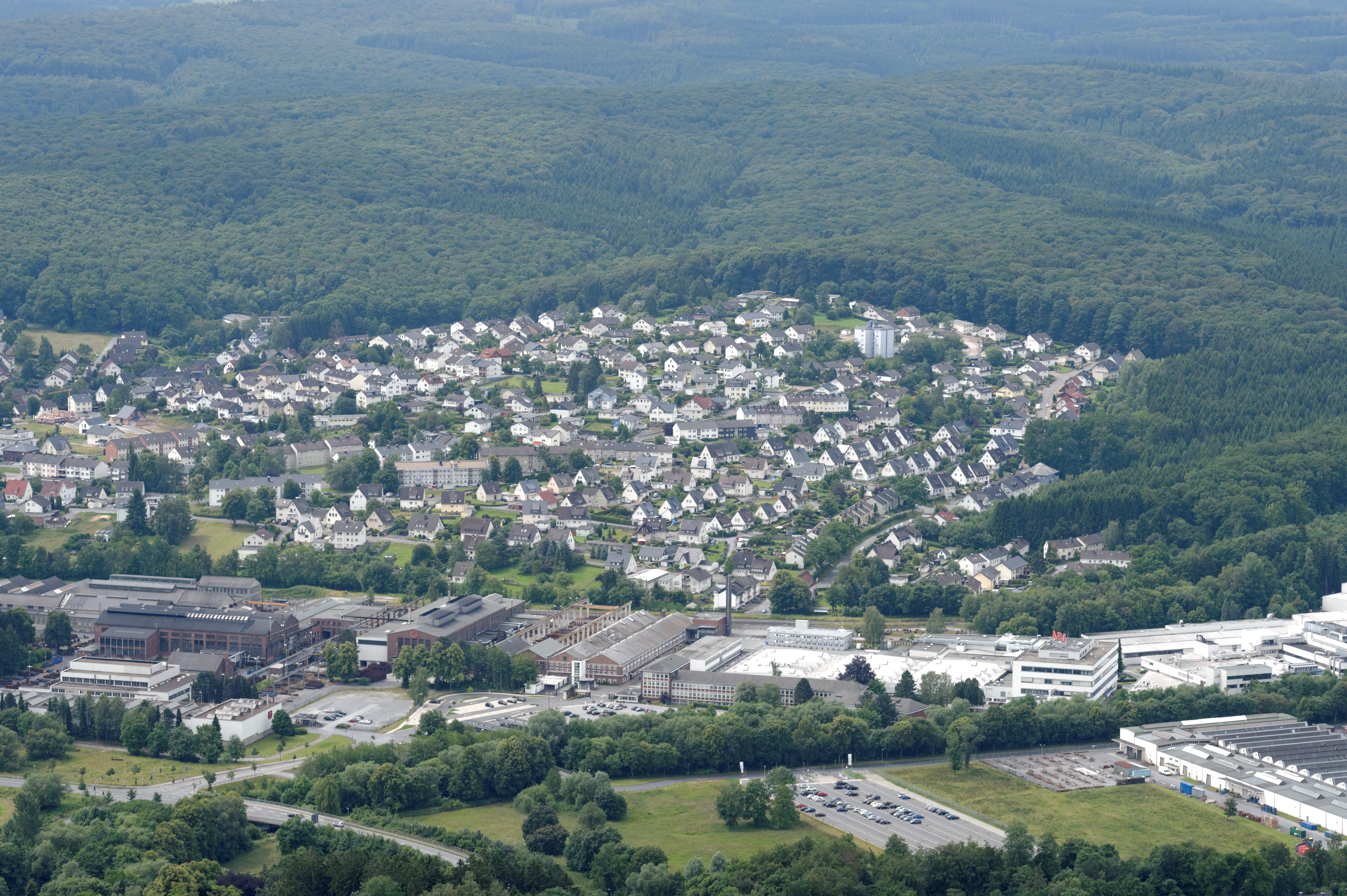
- Siepmann headquarters in Warstein, Germany
- Native name: Siepmann-Werke GmbH & Co KG
- Formerly: Siepmann-Werke A.-G.
- Type: Private
- Industry: Conglomerate, steel manufacturing
- Founded: February 2, 1891; 135 years ago in Warstein, Germany
- Founder: Louis Peters
- Headquarters: Warstein, Germany
- Area served: Worldwide
- Key people: Korinna Schwittay (CEO); Nicolai Siepmann (Board Member); Dr. Gerd Jaeger (advisor); Matthias Kleiner (advisor)
- Revenue: ▲US$105 million (2023)
- Owner: Heirs of Hugo Siepmann (75.25%); Heirs of Emil Siepmann (24.67%)
- Number of employees: 461(2022)
- Parent: Siepmann Industries
- Website: www.siepmann.de

Siepmann Industries (/ˈsiːpmən/; SEEP-muhn; colloquially referred to as Siepmann) is a German industrial concern headquartered in Warstein, Germany. Founded in 1891, Siepmann is primarily known for being active in the coal, steel, ammunition, armaments industry as well as important supplier to the automotive, maritime and energy industries.

The concern is primarily made up by two arms Siepmann-Werke GmbH & Co KG (drop steel foundry) and PERSTA-Stahlarmaturen GmbH & Co KG (valves) and historically belonged among the most important employers of the region, at peak employing over 3,000 employees, and important supplier to Germany during World War I and World War II, such as for curb chains and tanks. Siepmann was the second largest drop steel foundry after the Krupp concern.

== Overview ==
Siepmann is primarily controlled by the Hugo Siepmann branch of the family. The descendants of Emil Siepmann are non-active minority owners. The operations are still at the same location where it moved in 1909, with headquarters at Emil-Siepmann-Strasse named after Emil Siepmann. Siepmann manufactures for the railway, wind power, heavy duty, valve, marine, construction equipment, production and mining industries. It currently has the following divisions:

=== Divisions ===
- PERSTA Stahlarmaturen GmbH & Co KG (PERSTA Valves), Belecke
- SD Machining GmbH, Warstein
- VALTRA Armaturenhandels GmbH

=== Investments ===
- Siepmann Industries GmbH & Co KG (parent company)
- Siepmann Beteiligungs-GmbH (investment company)
PERSTA Stahl-Armaturen GmbH & Co KG

SD Machining GmbH

Siepmann-Werke GmbH & Co KG

== History ==
=== Early Beginnings (1834-1891) ===
The Siepmann concern had a predecessor company founded by the German industrialist Wilhelm Bergenthal (1805–1893) and his brother-in-law Ferdinand Gabriel in 1834 which was growing rapidly at the time. Bergenthal was an inventor and pioneer who brought production principles from Brandenburg to the Warstein area and established a manufacturing company for shovels made out of sheet steel. His companies employed 305 people in 1855.

=== The Overtake (1891) ===
After he filed for bankruptcy due to failure in management the company was taken-over by Louis Peters in 1891. He was the namesake for Peters & Cie. until it changed to the current Siepmann name. However, Louis Peters, did hand the daily business to his brothers-in-law Emil (1863–1950) and Hugo Siepmann the first one handling the technical development and the lather the commercial and sales departments. In 1909, Peters & Cie., bought a plot of industrial land in Belecke near the Warstein freight depot. They started to construct a new manufacturing plant as well as a intermodal connection to the railway system.

=== Siepmann Brothers (1910-1929) ===
The brothers, wo managed the company successfully, acquired the business in 1910 and subsequently officially became their owner. Shovels and spades pressed from sheet steel, forged hay and fertilizer forks, lattice spikes etc. were produced in both factories. Until then their main clients were in the agricultural and bicycle industries. In 1916, they began to manufacture for the automobile industry and were highly successful in delivering parts to German car manufacturers such as Mercedes-Benz, BMW or Adler. From 1917 they began to produce for the German government with larger armaments orders.

The post-war period with galloping inflation up to the introduction of the Rentenmark in November 1923 also caused great difficulties for domestic industry, which only led to a gradual improvement from 1925 onwards. In the years 1926/27 the latest welding technology was used, which allowed forgings to be welded together. Large quantities of these welded pieces were manufactured for the Deutsche Reichsbahn and for the victorious powers of the time as reparations. In 1927 the number of employees rose to over 400. During the Great Depression, triggered by the stock market crash on the New York Stock Exchange, the companies sales rapidly shrank and the production had to be severely curtailed. In 1932, the workforce fell to around 80 employees. Even the few remaining employees could at times only be employed on short-time work.

=== Great Depression Period (1930–1939) ===
During this period of economic difficulty, the main manufacturing plant in Warstein, was shut down in August 1930. All the facilities were moved to the newer plant in Belecke. From 1932, the energy previously generated by steam engines was replaced by electricity.With these and other technical investments, the cornerstone was laid for the rapid rise of Siepmann-Werke as a supplier to the automotive industry, which later seamlessly merged into the armaments industry. The Chronicle of the 1000-year anniversary of the Town of Belecke in 1938 states: "Siepmann-Werke are the most important industrial company in Belecke and the Möhne valley and have around 700 employees in the anniversary year." By securing the energy supply and important technical innovations, the Siepmann works became one of the most modern drop forges in Europe. The development led from the simple charcoal forge and coke oven to the oil-fired and finally gas-fired forge. After years of trials, a separate gas production plant was built in 1937/38. The gas was obtained from anthracite coals. In 1938, the Siepmann's built the first production line for forgings in Germany, consisting of three counterblow hammers, three presses and the associated furnaces. At that time, armaments for the German Wehrmacht were already on full production. The Siepmann works were the largest forge for armored track links.

=== World War II Period (1939-1945) ===
Siepmann grew rapidly during World War II and became the largest manufacturing company of the region with steady and fast growth. Own supply systems were created, investments were made in new technologies and also machines and hammers. In this way, productivity could be significantly increased. In 1932 the proportion of drop forgings was 1,533 tons, in 1944 39,980 tons were produced. The number of employees also rose sharply from an average of 141 employees in 1932 to 3,000 employees in 1945.

The economic situation was excellent. Then came the war and with it the first casualties. Forced rationing reduced the population's quality of life considerably, even if there was no depressing lack of food due to the still rural structure. But the last years of the war, with low-flying aircraft and artillery fire, made it clear to everyone where the demagogue Hitler and his followers had led the people. The importance of Siepmann for armaments is shown by the laying of a gas pipeline from Freieohl via Warstein to Belecke in 1941, i.e. during World War II. This eliminated the need for in-house gas production. By the end of the war, the company had steadily grown, and the output of tank tracks was constantly increasing. In addition to German specialists, French, Russian and, from 1943, also Italian prisoners of war were employed, as well as men and women from the occupied countries who had been conscripted by the Nazis, especially from the USSR. Towards the end of the Second World War, the company had between 1,700 and 3,000 employees . The area of the production facility in Belecke increased from 2,600 m^{2} when it was founded to 26,000 m^{2} in 1944. Sales and workforce peaked in 1944. The Siepmann works alone employed 572 Russian laborers.

=== Post War Period ===
After the end of the war, large parts of the factory were dismantled. Nevertheless, the number of employees increased again to 1,300 in 1960. In March 1963, a heavy explosion occurred at the plant. 20 employees died in the accident and there were also numerous injuries. In the second generation the concern was led by Walter Siepmann, Sr. (1902–1985), Alfred Siepmann (1899–1974) and their cousin Ernst L. Siepmann (1906–1968), the successor of Emil Siepmann. Ernst studied at the Technical University of Aachen, where he met and acquainted Alfried Krupp von Bohlen and Hallbach, sole heir to Krupp, who was appointed to the company board soon thereafter. The group continued to grow with the founding of PERSTA-Stahlarmaturen GmbH & Co. KG. A manufacturing and supply company for industrial fittings. In the 1970s, Walter Siepmann, Sr., acquired the entire concern after the death of his brother. He gained substantial wealth through his industrial patents, which were used worldwide, only a minority of the company remained in the hands of the heirs of Emil Siepmann.

== Recent events ==
In 2014, the concern management was handed from Walter Siepmann Jr. (1943–2021), to the fourth generation. Korinna Schwittay (née Siepmann) became the Chief executive officer of the group, having previously being employed with BASF in several executive positions for over a decade. Schwittay is also a member and vice president of the general assembly of IHK Arnsberg (Chamber of Commerce and Industry). A minority of the group is still owned by the heirs of Emil Siepmann, of which Nicolai Siepmann (board member) is a great-grandson.

== Literature ==
- Theodor Thüsing (1920), Die wirtschaftliche Entwicklung des Kreises Arnsberg unter besonderer Berücksichtigung der letzten 50. Jahre, Diss. Münster (page 57 to 59)
- Siepmann-Werke, Commemorative Siepmann Industries 1891–1951
- Dr. Felix Rexhausen, Mit dem Balsrohr leben, Der Spiegel Magazine, February 9, 1962
- Dr. Mechthild Barthel-Kranzbühler (1976), Ein Schmied versteht sich gut aufs Schweissen: 50 Jahre im Gesenk schmieden und schweissen, Das westfälische Sauerland, 1976
