= Westfalia Dinnendahl Gröppel =

Defunct German mechanical engineering company

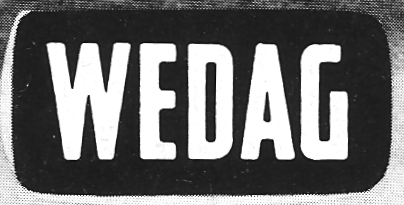
- Logo used in the 1950s
- Company type: Private
- Industry: Mechanical engineering
- Founded: 1872; 153 years ago in Essen, German Empire
- Founder: Alfred Lämmerhirt; Franz Dinnendahl; Carl Lührig; Franz Gröppel
- Defunct: 2001
- Fate: Merger
- Successor: KHD Humboldt Wedag
- Headquarters: Bochum
- Number of employees: 3,000+

Westfalia Dinnendahl Gröppel (WEDAG; formerly Eisenhütte Westfalia, R.W. Dinnendahl AG, and Fr. Gröppel, C. Lührigs Nachf) was a German mechanical engineering company founded in 1872. It was primarily known for manufacturing coal and water processing plants used in the mining industry. In 2001, the company merged to KHD Humboldt Wedag.
