= Warstein =

- Town
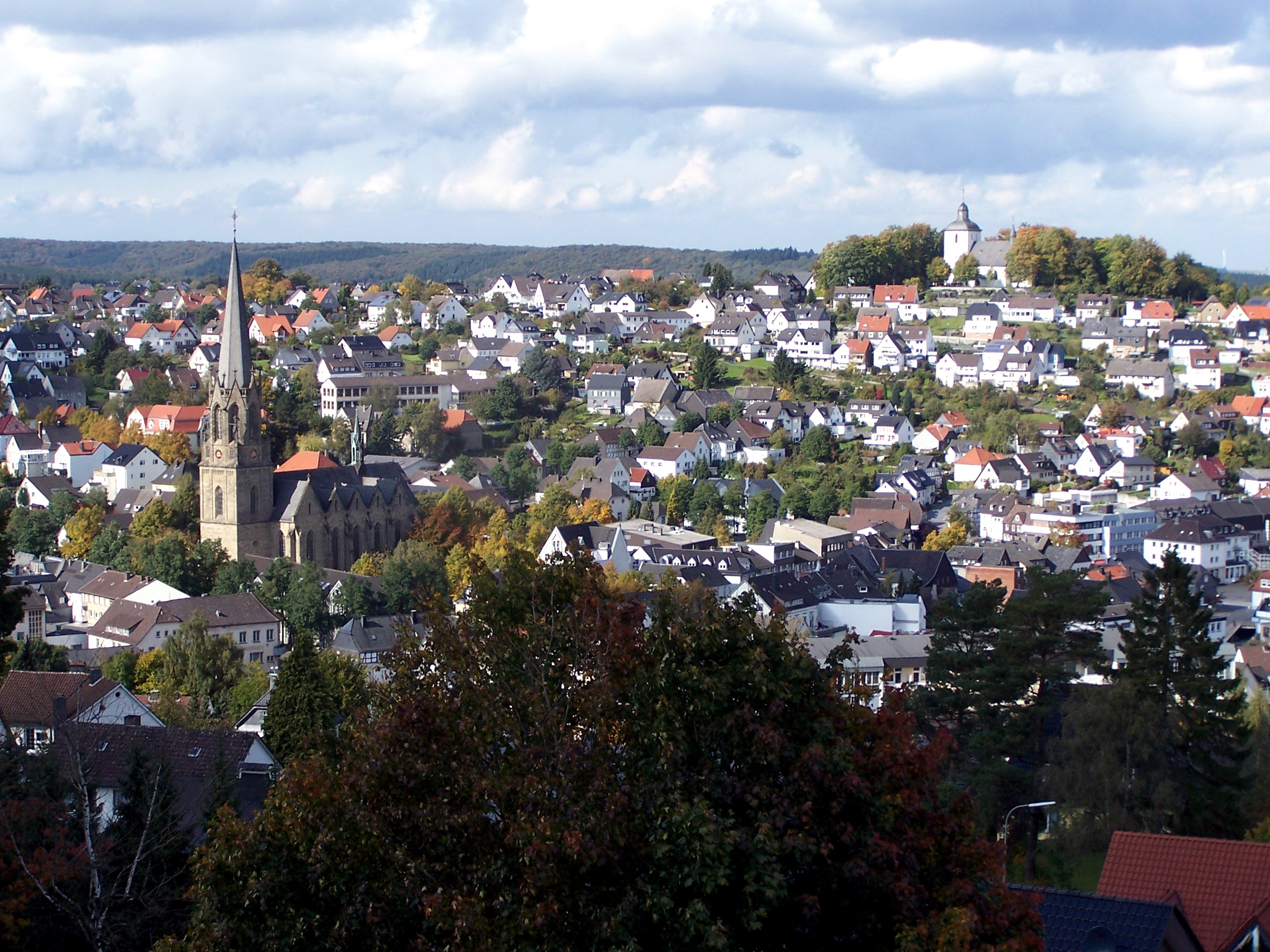
- View of Warstein with St. Pancratius and the Old Church

- Coat of arms

- Location of Warstein within Soest district
- Interactive map of Warstein
- Location within Germany Location within North Rhine-Westphalia
- Coordinates: 51°27′N 8°21′E
- Country: Germany
- State: North Rhine-Westphalia
- Admin. region: Arnsberg
- District: Soest
- Subdivisions: 9

Government
  - Mayor (2020–25): Thomas Schöne (Ind.)

Area
  - Total: 158.03 km^{2} (61.02 sq mi)
- Elevation: 310 m (1,020 ft)

Population (2025-12-31)
  - Total: 24,857
  - Density: 157.29/km^{2} (407.39/sq mi)
- Time zone: UTC+01:00 (CET)
  - Summer (DST): UTC+02:00 (CEST)
- Postal codes: 59581
- Dialling codes: 02902 (Warstein), 02925 (Allagen)
- Vehicle registration: SO
- Website: www.warstein.de

Warstein (German pronunciation: [ˈvaːɐ̯ˌʃtaɪn]) is a municipality with town status in the district of Soest, in North Rhine-Westphalia, Germany. It is located at the north end of Sauerland.

== Geography ==
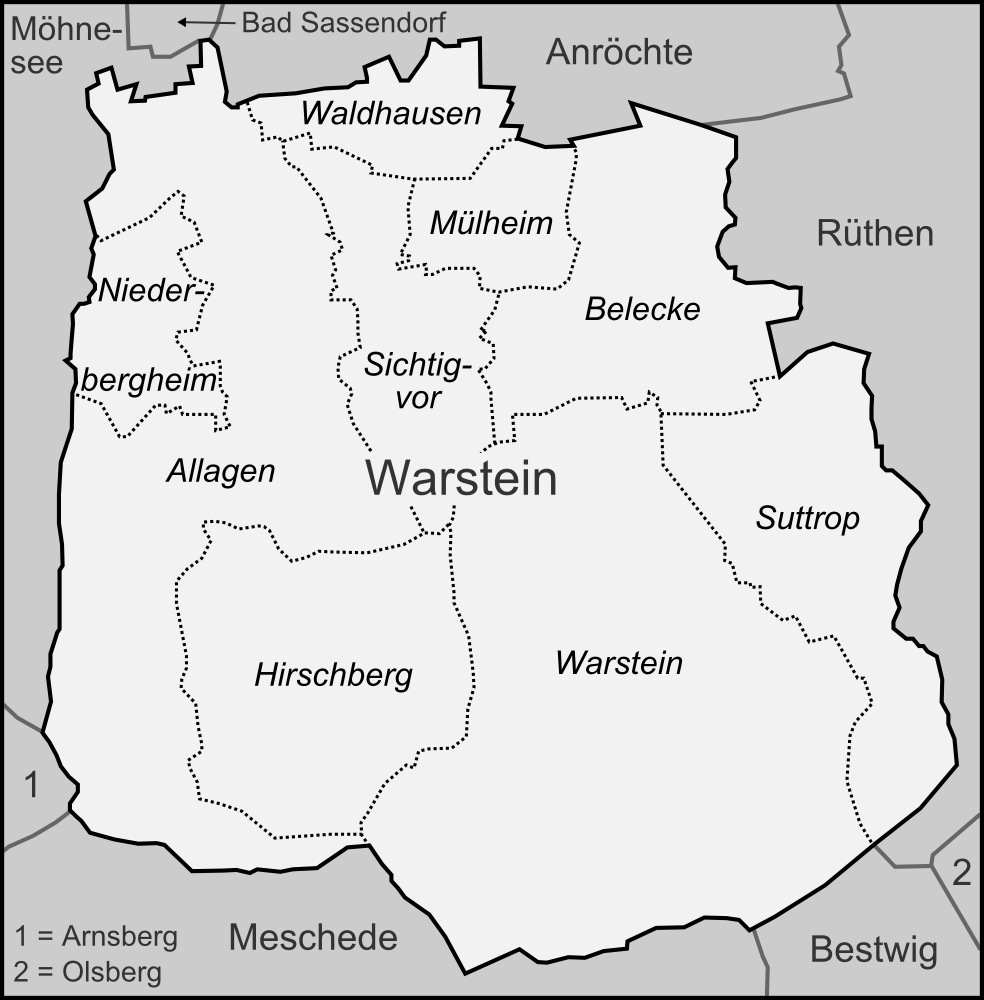
Map of the nine districts of Warstein

Warstein is located north of the Arnsberger Wald (forest), at a brook called Wäster. The area south of the city is mostly forested; the lightly forested Haarstrang mountain is to the north. The river Möhne flows between these two areas. The highest elevation is 581 m (1,906 ft) in the south of the city near a hill called Stimm Stamm; the lowest elevation is 216 m (709 ft) in the village Waldhausen in the north.

=== Neighbouring municipalities ===
The following municipalities, some with town status, border Warstein (clockwise, beginning in the north): Anröchte, Rüthen (town), Bestwig, Meschede (town), Arnsberg (town), Möhnesee, Bad Sassendorf. Of these, Bestwig and Meschede are in the district of Hochsauerlandkreis, on Warstein's (and, thus, Soest district's) southern border.

=== Subdivisions ===
While named for the main settled portion within its 157.91 square kilometres (60.97 sq mi) total area, the town can be roughly divided into the following subdivisions (German: Ortsteil):

- Allagen
- Belecke
- Hirschberg
- Mülheim
- Niederbergheim
- Sichtigvor
- Suttrop
- Waldhausen
- Warstein

== History ==
The evidence of human life was found in the Bilstein Cave between Warstein and Hirschberg.

Warstein was first mentioned officially in the year 1072. Historians once thought Warstein was organized as an official town in 1276, but its exact charter date is unclear. Likely, it was founded between 1276 and 1296 by the Archbishop of Cologne, Siegfried von Westerburg.

In the Middle Ages, Warstein was part of the Hanseatic League, a trade association for guilds, a very important international trading association at that time.

A fire in 1802 destroyed a significant portion of the town. After the 1802 fire the town centre was moved to the Wester brook. In 1844, the Amt Warstein was founded.

In 1975, Warstein and the other eight independent villages merged to form the new borough of Warstein.

== Population ==
Historical population

Year	Pop.	±% p.a.
1965	27,672	—
1970	29,187	+1.07%
1975	29,229	+0.03%
1980	28,328	−0.62%
1985	27,664	−0.47%
1990	28,363	+0.50%
1995	29,566	+0.83%

Year	Pop.	±% p.a.
2000	29,028	−0.37%
2005	28,496	−0.37%
2010	27,170	−0.95%
2015	25,407	−1.33%
2020	24,520	−0.71%
2025	24,857	+0.27%

Source: Landesdatabank Nordrhein-Westfalen

=== List of mayors ===
- 1999–2004: Georg Juraschka (SPD)
- 2004–2015: Manfred Gödde (BG)
- 2015–incumbent: Thomas Schöne (CDU)

== International relations ==
Warstein is twinned with:

- Saint-Pol-sur-Ternoise, France - twinned in 1964
- Wurzen, Saxony, Germany - twinned 3 October 1990
- Hebden Royd, United Kingdom - twinned November 1995
- Pietrapaola, Italy - an official friendship since 2001

== Economy ==
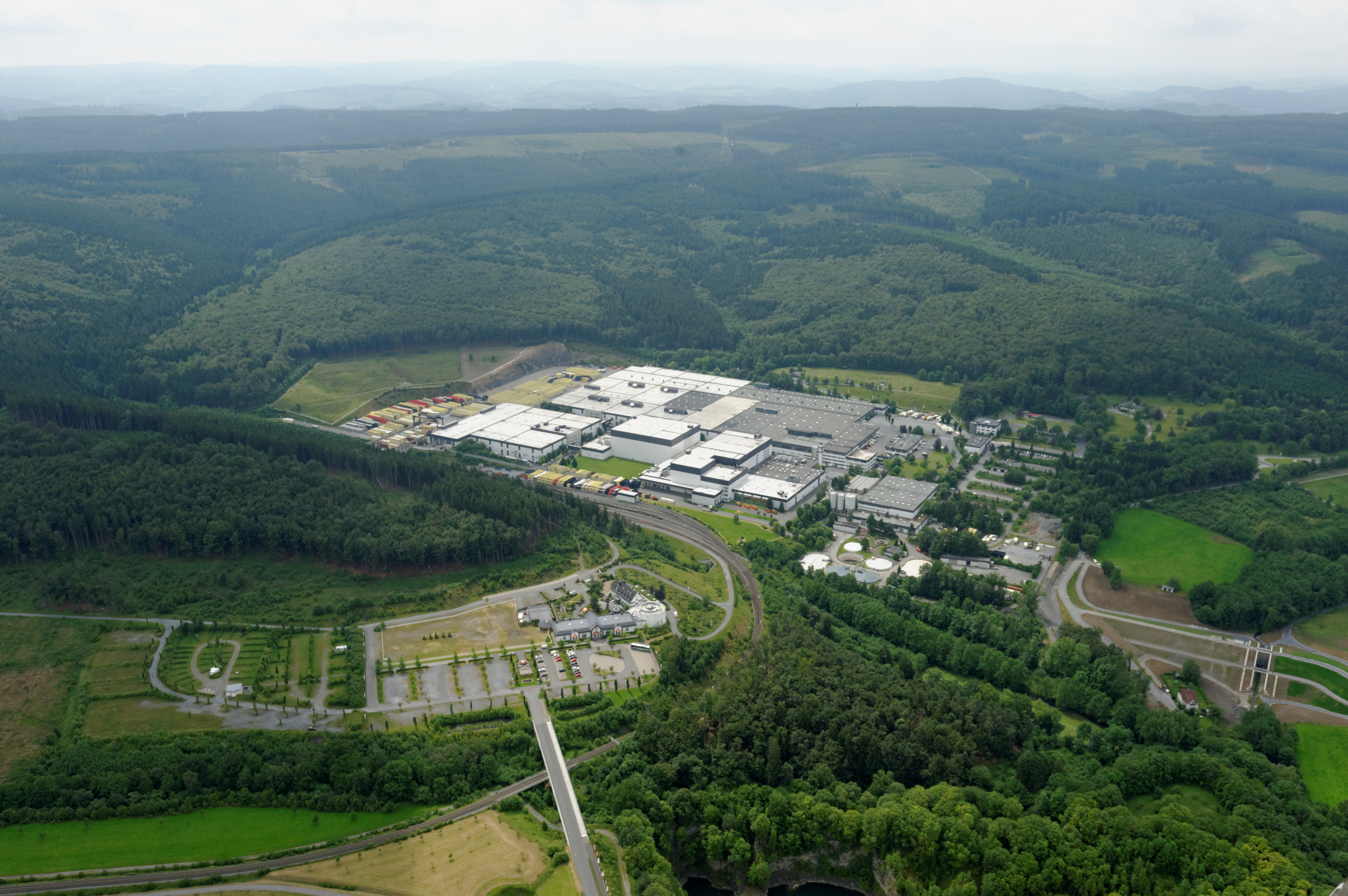
Warsteiner Brewery in Warstein

The largest employer in Warstein is the Warsteiner brewery, founded in 1753. It is one of the largest breweries in Germany. Second largest employer is steel mill operator Siepmann-Werke, founded in 1891. In addition to its mills, the overall Siepmann Group head office is located in Warstein.

== Notable people ==
- Benito Bause (born 1921), television actor
- Georg Dassel (1852-1934), quarry owner and industrialist
- Friedhelm Hillebrand (born 1940), engineer
- Karl-Werner Schulte (born 1946), professor
- Hugo Siepmann (1868-1950), industrialist
- Emil Siepmann (1863-1950), industrialist an namesake of Emil-Siepmann-Strasse
- Jan-Lennard Struff (born 1990), tennis player notable for becoming the first lucky loser to reach a Masters 1000 final
