= Bogolubovia =

Bogolubovia Temporal range: Campanian

Scientific classification
- Kingdom: Animalia
- Phylum: Chordata
- Class: Reptilia
- Order: †Pterosauria
- Suborder: †Pterodactyloidea
- Clade: †Pteranodontoidea
- Family: †Pteranodontidae
- Genus: †Bogolubovia; Nessov & Yarkov, 1989

Type species
- †Ornithostoma orientalis Bogolubov, 1914

Species
- †B. orientalis (Bogolubov, 1914)

Synonyms
- Ornithostoma orientalis Bogolubov, 1914; Pteranodon orientalis (Bogolubov, 1914)

Genus of pteranodontid pterosaur from the Late Cretaceous

Bogolubovia is a genus of pterosaur from the Upper Cretaceous (early Campanian) Rybushka Formation of Petrovsk, Saratov Oblast, Russia. It is named for Nikolai Nikolaevich Bogolubov, the paleontologist who discovered the remains in 1914.

== Description ==
Bogolubovia would have been a mid-sized pterosaur, with an estimated wingspan of 3–4 metres (9.8–13.1 ft) suggested by the holotype; a later found radius indicates a wingspan of 4.3 metres (14 ft).

== Classification ==
Bogolubov had initially assigned the specimen, consisting of a single partial large cervical vertebra, as a new species of Ornithostoma, O. orientalis. It was later reclassified as a species of Pteranodon, before being reassigned to a separate genus of Pteranodontidae by Lev Nessov and Alexander Yarkov in 1989. The holotype has probably been lost, but other partial remains have been referred to the genus.

Some paleontologists considered it a probable member of the family Azhdarchidae. In 2008, however, it was considered to be a nomen dubium that might in fact be identical to the genus Volgadraco, another pterosaur from Russia. In 2020, Averianov and Arkhangelsky suggested that the cervical vertebrae of Bogolubovia is similar to that of Volgadraco, reconsidered as a pteranodontid, and thus this genus is likely a pteranodontid. New remains described in 2022 suggested that Bogulobovia and Volgadraco were both valid species of pteranodontids.

== See also ==
- Timeline of pterosaur research
