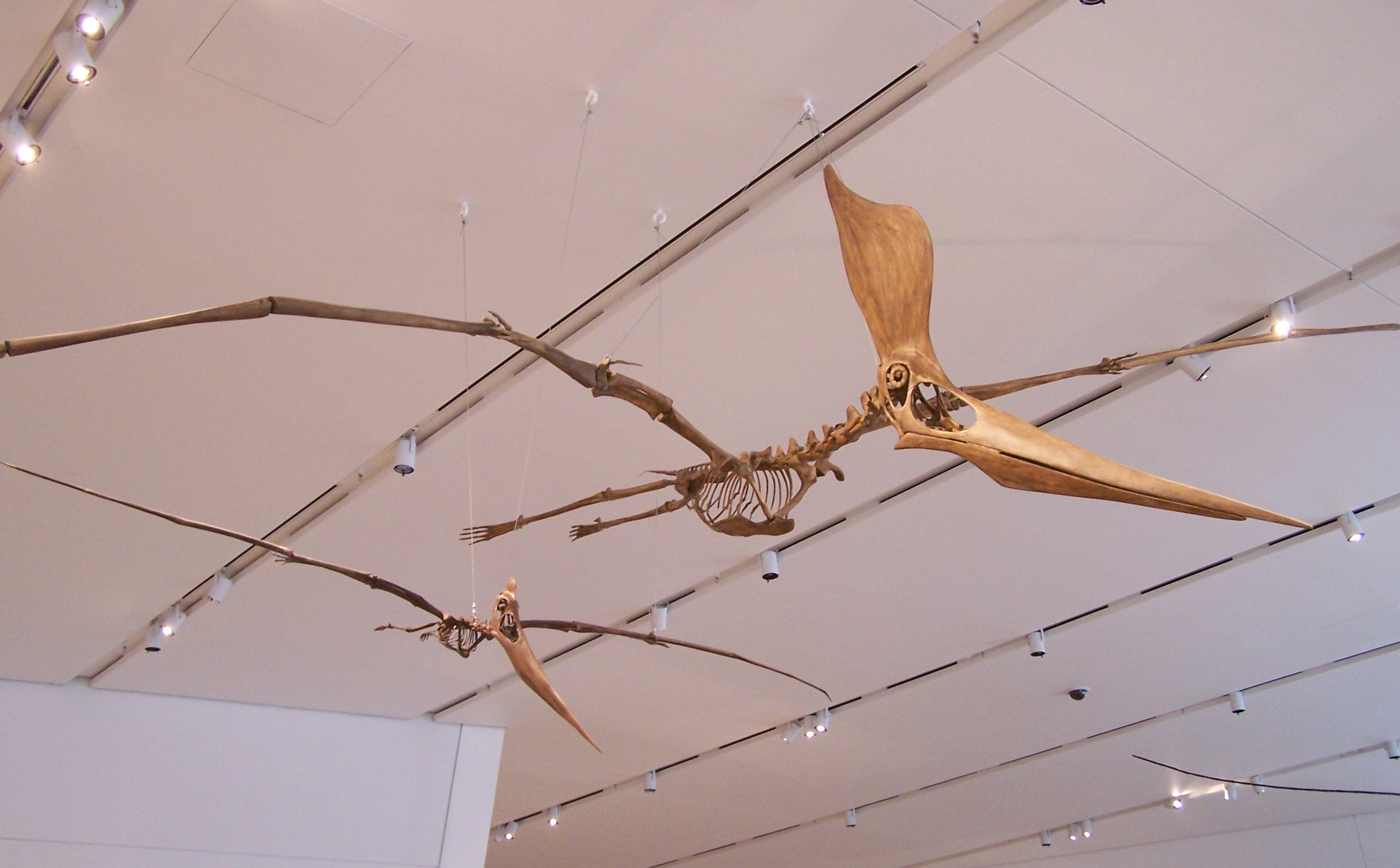
- Mounted replicas of female and male Geosternbergia sternbergi skeletons (Royal Ontario Museum).

Scientific classification
- Kingdom: Animalia
- Phylum: Chordata
- Class: Reptilia
- Order: †Pterosauria
- Suborder: †Pterodactyloidea
- Clade: †Pteranodontoidea
- Clade: †Pteranodontia
- Family: †Pteranodontidae; Marsh, 1876

Type species
- †Pteranodon longiceps Marsh, 1876

Genera
- †Bogolubovia; †Dawndraco; †Geosternbergia; †Ornithostoma?; †Pteranodon; †Tethydraco?; †Volgadraco?

= Pteranodontidae =

Pteranodontids Temporal range: Late Cretaceous, Coniacian–Campanian

Family of pteranodontian pterosaurs

The Pteranodontidae are a family of large pterosaurs from the Late Cretaceous of North America and possibly other continents including Europe and Africa. The family was named in 1876 by Othniel Charles Marsh. Pteranodontids had a distinctive, elongated crest jutting from the rear of the head (most famously seen in Pteranodon itself). The spectacularly-crested Nyctosaurus is sometimes included in this family, though usually placed in its own family, the Nyctosauridae (Nicholson & Lydekker, 1889).

Modern researchers differ in their use of the concept. S. Christopher Bennett and Alexander Kellner have concluded that Nyctosaurus was not a pteranodontid. In 1994 Bennett defined a clade Pteranodontidae, also including species of the Ornithocheiromorpha. However, this definition has not been accepted by other workers. Alexander Kellner, for example, named several additional species for specimens previously classified as Pteranodon, and placed P. sternbergi in a distinct genus, Geosternbergia. Kellner re-defined Pteranodontidae as the most recent common ancestor of Pteranodon longiceps, Geosternbergia sternbergi and Dawndraco kanzai, and all of its descendants. This definition is now contentious, however, as the validity of Dawndraco has been disputed. This clade possibly includes the nyctosaurids. Analyses by David Unwin did indicate a close relationship between Pteranodon and Nyctosaurus, and he used the name Pteranodontia for the clade containing both.

Pteranodontids are primarily known from the Coniacian to Campanian stages of the Cretaceous in North America and Japan. However, potential Maastrichtian remains have been identified from several other locations, being actually rather common in the Maastrichtian of the Tethys Sea. Beginning in 2016, Nicholas Longrich, David Martill, and Brian Andres presented evidence of several nyctosaurid and pteranodontid species from the latest Maastrichtian age of north Africa, suggesting that both lineages went through an evolutionary radiation in the Tethys region shortly before the K–Pg extinction event. Additionally, later phylogenetic studies imply that they represent a ghost lineage dating much earlier in the Cretaceous. Volgadraco, previously assumed to be an azhdarchid, has also since been relocated to pteranodontidae.
