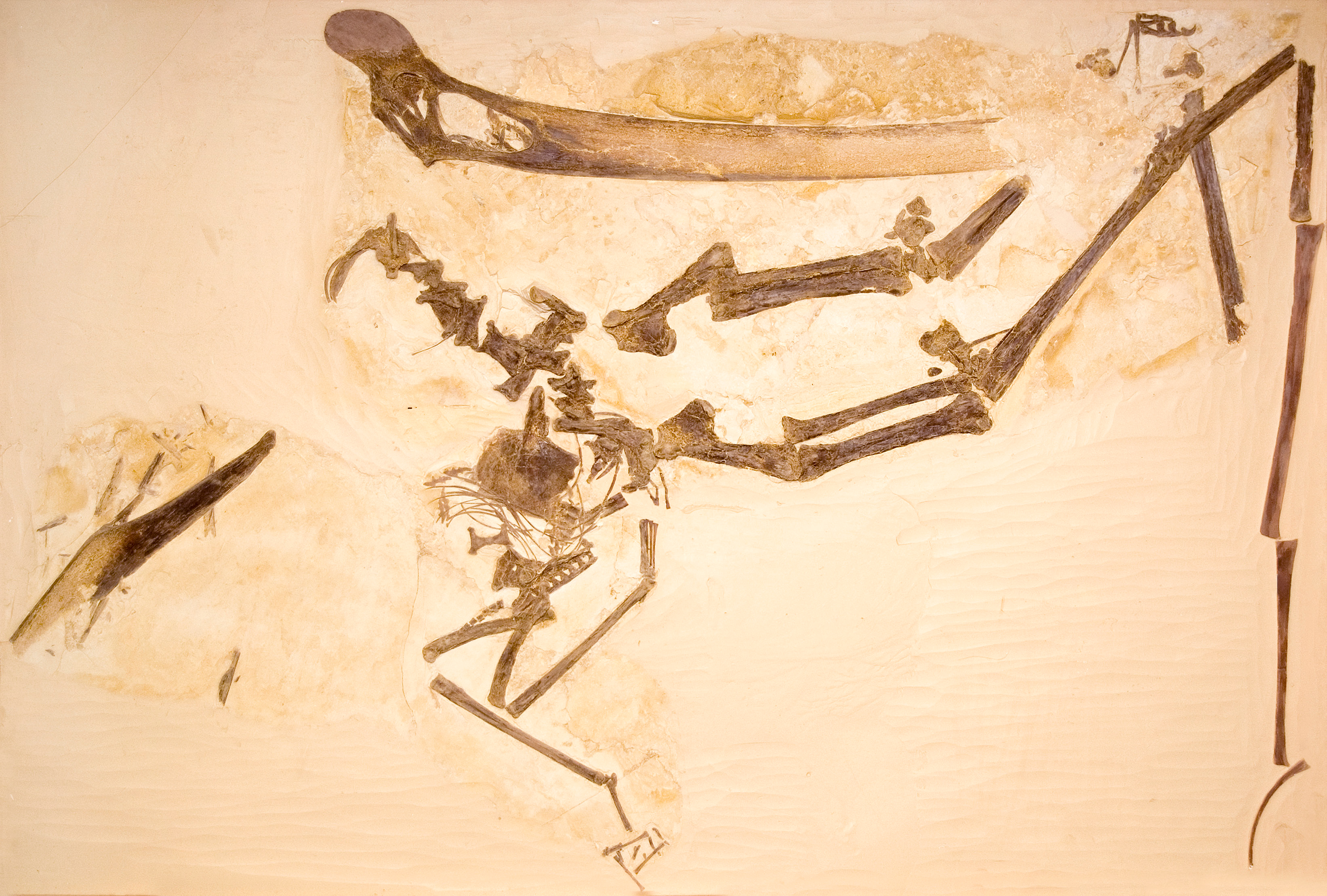
- Holotype

Scientific classification
- Domain: Eukaryota
- Kingdom: Animalia
- Phylum: Chordata
- Order: †Pterosauria
- Suborder: †Pterodactyloidea
- Family: †Pteranodontidae
- Genus: †Dawndraco; Kellner, 2010
- Species: †D. kanzai

Binomial name
- †Dawndraco kanzai Kellner, 2010

= Dawndraco =

Dawndraco Temporal range: Late Cretaceous, 86 Ma

Genus of pteranodontid pterosaur from the Late Cretaceous

Dawndraco is a controversial genus of pteranodontid pterosaur from the Late Cretaceous of North America. It is likely synonymous with the contemporary pteranodontid Geosternbergia.

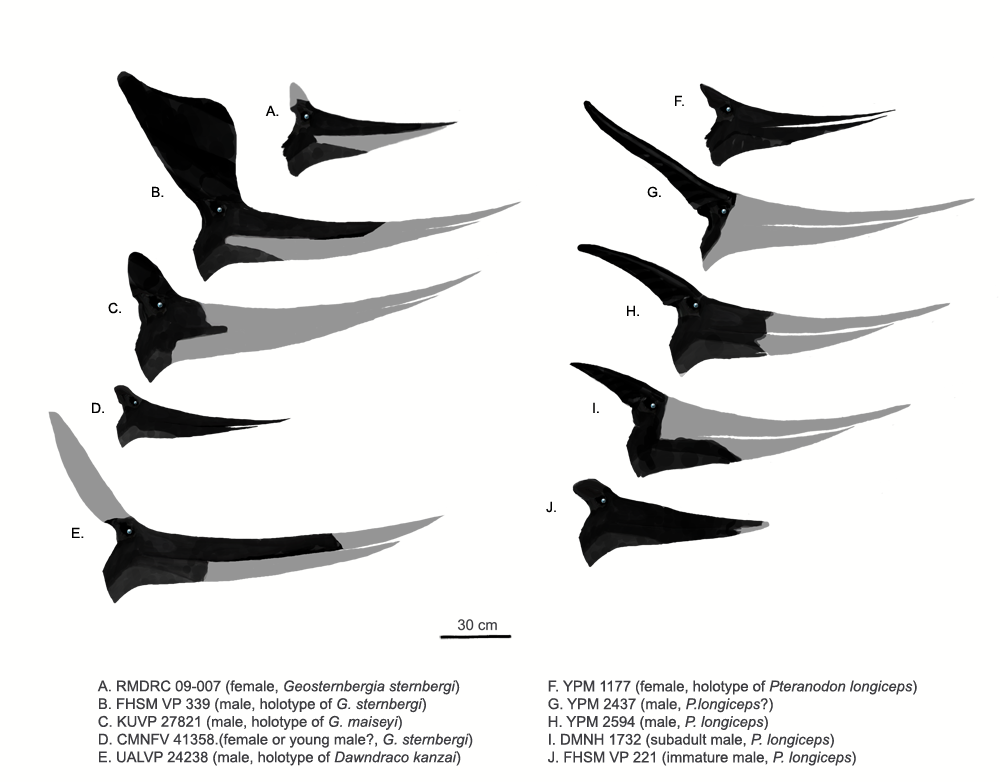
Variation in cranial anatomy of pteranodonts, Dawndraco in lower left (drawn to scale, unpreserved portions shown in gray)

Dawndraco was named by Alexander W.A. Kellner in 2010. The type species is Dawndraco kanzai. The generic name combines the Dawn deity of the Iroquois with a Latin draco, "dragon". The specific name refers to the Kanza tribe of Kansas.

Dawndraco is based on the holotype specimen UALVP 24238, a partial skeleton including an almost complete skull and lower jaws. It was recovered in 1974 by Richard C. Fox and Allen Lindoe from rocks of the lower part of the Smoky Hill Chalk Member of the Niobrara Formation in Utica, Kansas. These rocks date to the late Coniacian or early Santonian stage, about 86 million years ago.

The specimen was earlier referred to Pteranodon sternbergi. However, when Kellner in 2010 assigned this latter species to the genus Geosternbergia, he concluded that specimen UALVP 24238 was too different from it to be accounted for by individual variation or sexual dimorphism and therefore named a separate genus. A unique trait is that the snout does not strongly taper anteriorly as with Pteranodon, the upper and lower margins running almost parallel instead. Kellner further argued that the provenance of the specimen - from rock units between those of other Pteranodon holotypes - supported his interpretation of morphological differences as being taxonomic in nature, rather than relating to growth or gender. 'Dawndraco' was assigned by Kellner to the Pteranodontidae.

In a detailed description and discussion of UALVP 24238, Martin-Silverstone et al. (2017) concluded that 'D. kanzai' was not a distinct genus or species from Pteranodon. They showed that its taxonomic characterisations were suspect or erroneous, and that stratigraphic arguments used to further distinguish 'D. kanzai' from other pteranodontids were questionable when compared to the geologic ranges of other Smoky Hill Chalk species. They concluded that UALVP 24238 is better interpreted as a small (not fully osteologically mature) individual of the larger size-class (male) of Pteranodon sternbergi. Their interpretation echoes sceptism expressed about the 2010 Pteranodon revision from other palaeontologists, several of whom have continued to use pre-2010 taxonomies when discussing the Smoky Hill Chalk pteranodonts. In 2014, Andres, Clark, and Xu stated that they would continue to follow the pre-2010 taxonomy of pteranodontids, and referred the new species named by Kellner, including Dawndraco, back to their original classifications following Bennett.

== See also ==
- List of pterosaur genera
- Timeline of pterosaur research
