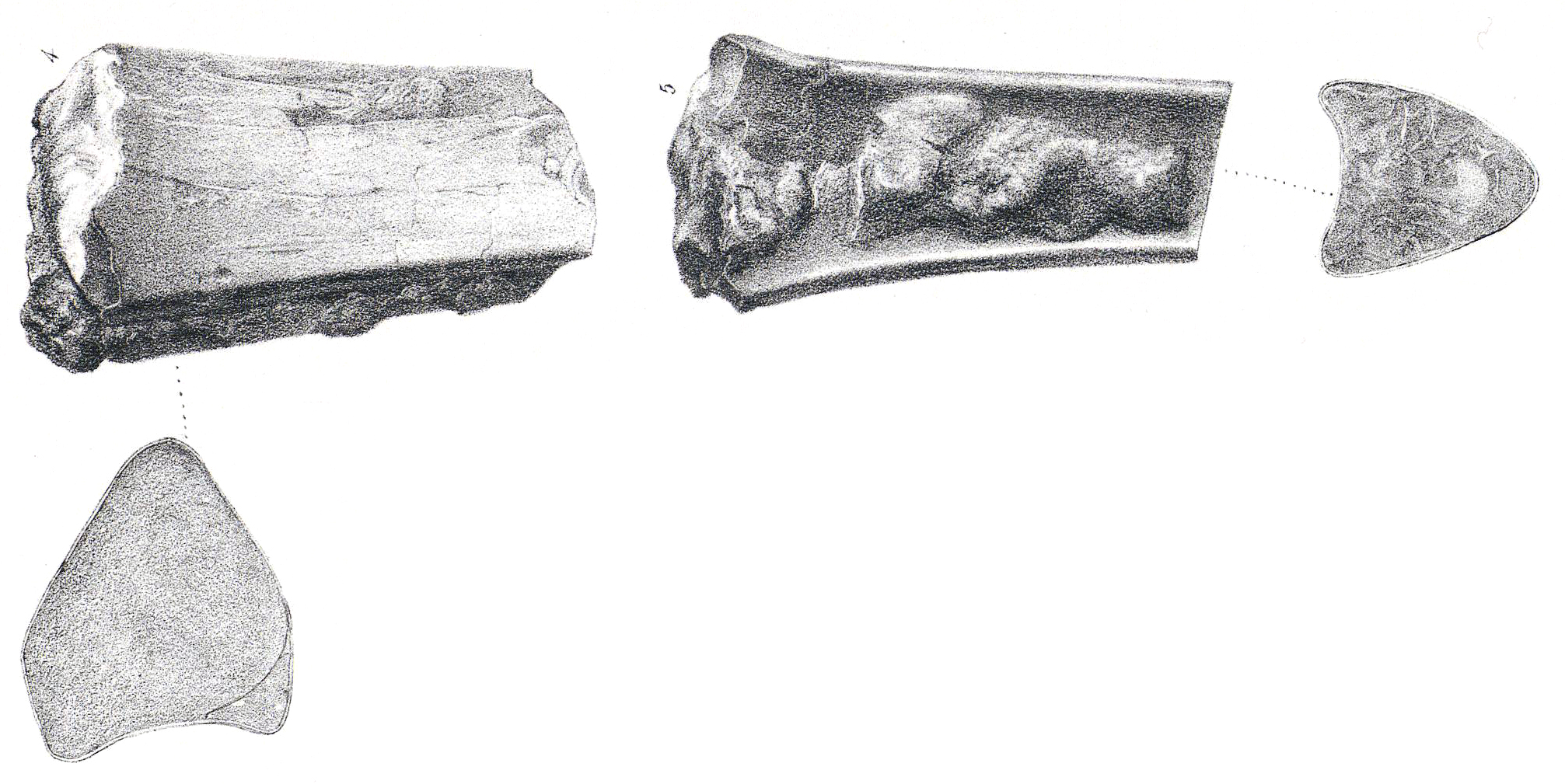
- Holotype rostrum fragment

Scientific classification
- Kingdom: Animalia
- Phylum: Chordata
- Class: Reptilia
- Order: †Pterosauria
- Suborder: †Pterodactyloidea
- Clade: †Azhdarchoidea
- Family: †Chaoyangopteridae
- Genus: †Ornithostoma; Seeley, 1871
- Species: †O. sedgwicki

Binomial name
- †Ornithostoma sedgwicki Seeley, 1891

Synonyms
- Ornithostoma seeleyi Lydekker, 1894

= Ornithostoma =

Ornithostoma Temporal range: Early Cretaceous, 110 Ma

Genus of azhdarchoid pterosaur from the Early Cretaceous

Ornithostoma (meaning "bird mouth") is a genus of pterodactyloid pterosaur that lived during the Early Cretaceous period (Albian stage) of Europe, around 110 million years ago. Ornithostoma was once thought to have been a senior synonym of the pteranodontid Pteranodon due to its toothless anatomy and prior naming.

== History ==
In 1869, Harry Govier Seeley, cataloguing the fossils of the Sedgwick Museum at Cambridge, referred three snout fragments of toothless pterosaur specimens from the Lower Cretaceous Albian Cambridge Greensand of England to Ornithocheirus simus. These fragments had in 1859 been described by Richard Owen (who considered the later holotype jaw fragment part of a metacarpal) and referred to Pterodactylus sedgwickii and Pterodactylus fittoni. By 1871 Seeley had realised Ornithocheirus simus was a toothed form, different from the fragments. Therefore, he provisionally named them as a separate genus Ornithostoma, the name derived from Greek ὄρνις, ornis, "bird", and στόμα, stoma, "mouth". Seeley as yet provided no specific name. In 1891 however, he named the type species Ornithostoma sedgwicki Seeley 1891, apart from the snout fragments also referring to pelvis elements, claiming it was identical to Pteranodon and had priority. On that occasion he also selected a genolectotype from the three fragments, the holotype of the type species: specimen CAMSM B.54485.

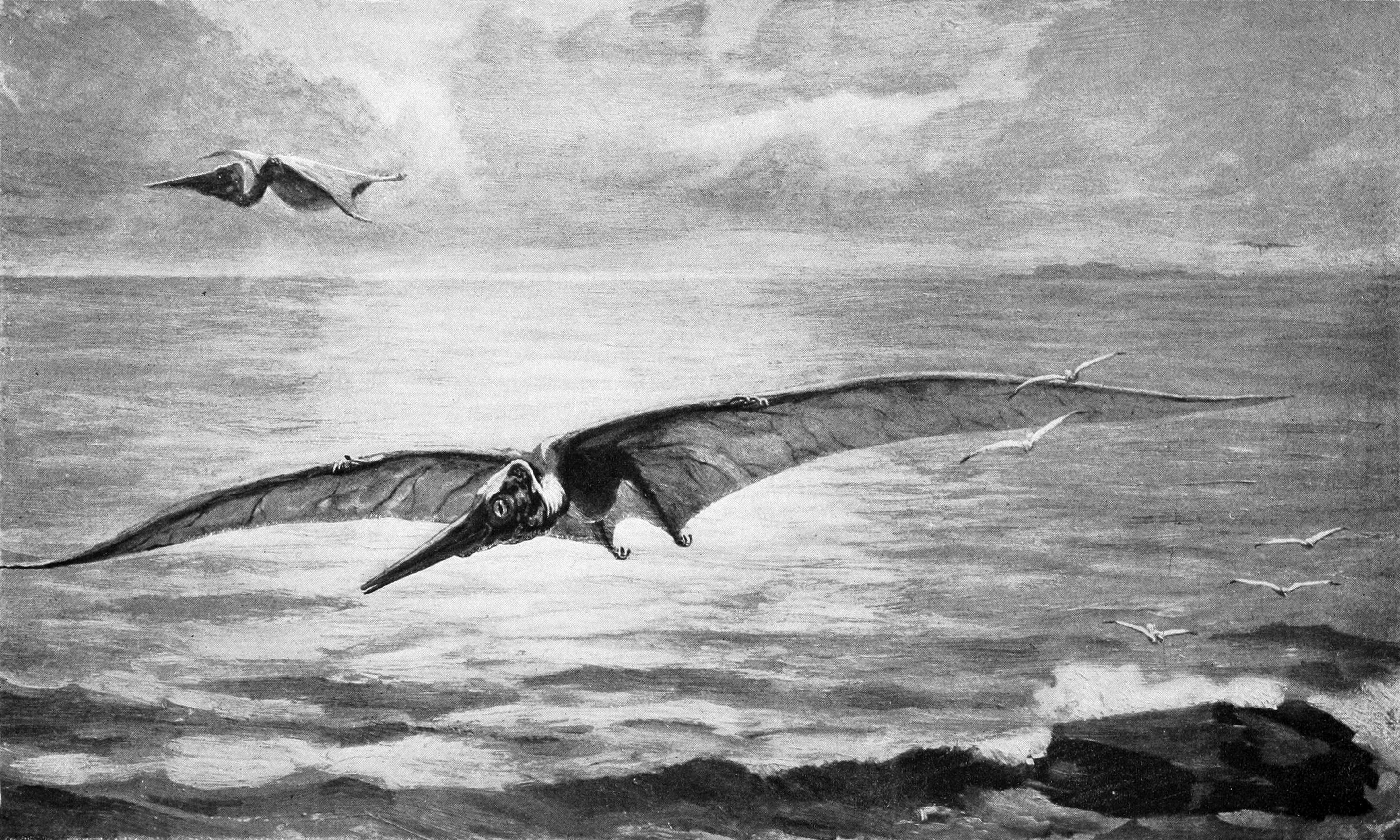
Outdated life restoration of O. ingens from 1904, now considered Pteranodon

Samuel Wendell Williston in 1893 independently also considered Ornithostoma a synonym of Pteranodon ingens. He therefore renamed Pteranodon species: Ornithostoma ingens (Marsh 1872) Williston 1893 = Pteranodon ingens (= P. longiceps) and Ornithostoma harpyia (Cope 1872) = P. longiceps. Williston also created a special family and subfamily for Ornithostoma: the Ornithostomatidae and the Ornithostomatinae. Today, these concepts are no longer used. Williston indicated O. ingens as the type species, not knowing one had already been designated. However, Richard Lydekker denied the identity in 1904 and, also unaware of Seeley's earlier species name, created a purported (third) type species O. seeleyi.

The holotype specimen is a snout fragment with a length of about five centimetres or two inches. It represents a triangular cross-section of the snout, about an inch high. There is no crest and the jaws are toothless but featuring low protruding rims. The fragment is tapering towards the front, the upper edge inclining under an angle of 12°, indicating the snout tip was located about ten centimetres to the front of the breakage forming the anterior edge of the fragment.

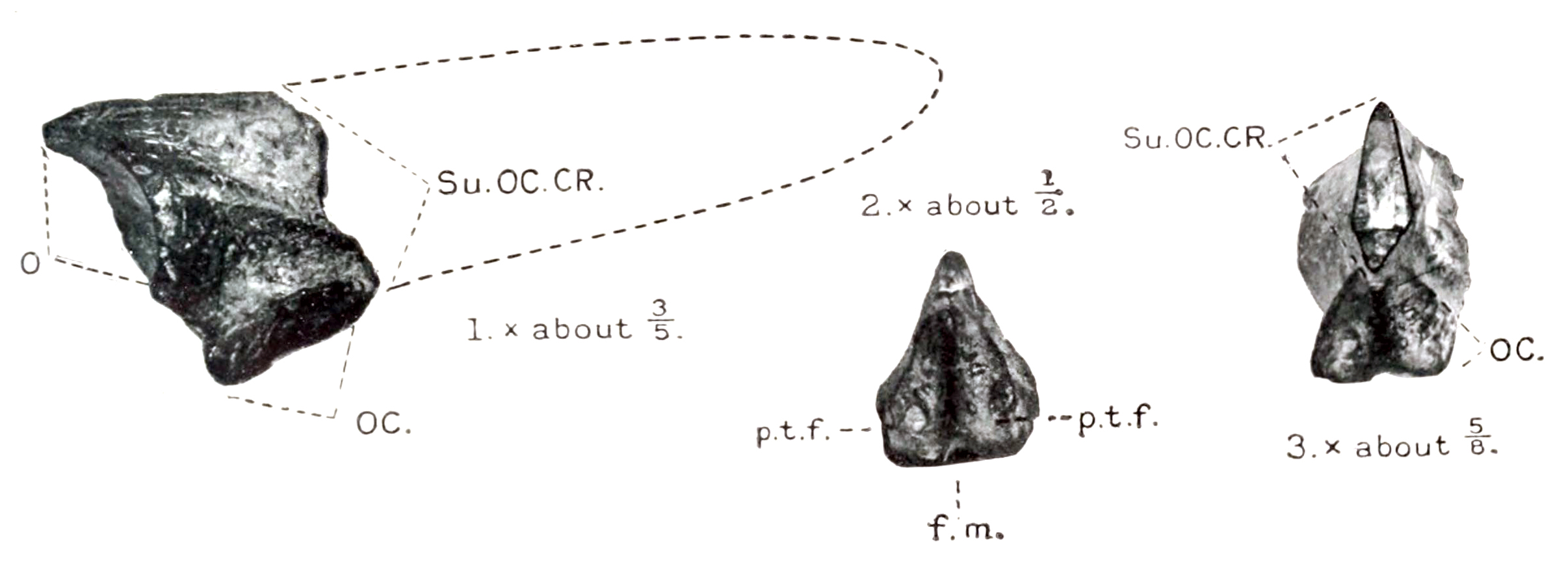
Skull fragment assigned by Hooley in 1914, in three views; this became the basis of the new genus Hintighernia in 2026

In 1914, Reginald Walter Hooley reviewed the material. He, incorrectly, claimed the pelvis elements were misidentified parts of the notarium of the shoulder girdle and referred several additional specimens to Ornithostoma, among them a skull fragment featuring a crest base, specimen CAMSM B.54406, and postcranial fragments such as vertebrae and limbs.

In a 1994 paper, S. Christopher Bennett like Lydekker considered Ornithostoma to be distinct from Pteranodon, mainly because of the lower edge ridges of the jaw. He also concluded that it was a nomen dubium. This in 2001 was rejected however, by David Unwin who thought Ornithostoma to be a valid genus belonging to the Pteranodontidae, but limited the referable material to the original three fragments, including perhaps CAMSM B.54406, and places the wingspan of Ornithostoma at 2-3 meters. Hooley's postcranial fragments he referred to Lonchodectes. In 2012, Alexander O. Averianov again recombined the holotype with CAMSM B.54406 and selected postcrania, the combination showing traits that indicated a position in the Azhdarchoidea, representing an animal similar in some ways to Tapejara.

There has also been an Ornithostoma species based on a find from Russia. In 1914 Nikolai Nikolaevich Bogolubov named a single large vertebra found near Petrovsk Ornithostoma orientalis. The name was emended to O. orientale by George Olshevsky in 1991 because stoma is neuter. It has been renamed Bogolubovia orientalis (Nesov & Yarkov 1989) and been transferred from the Pteranodontidae to the Azhdarchidae.

In 2020, Roy E. Smith and colleagues restricted Ornithostoma to include only jaw fragments, and considered it an azhdarchoid. Subsequent studies suggest Ornithostoma is a member of the Chaoyangopteridae.

== See also ==
- List of pterosaur genera
- Timeline of pterosaur research
