= List of Australian and Antarctic dinosaurs =

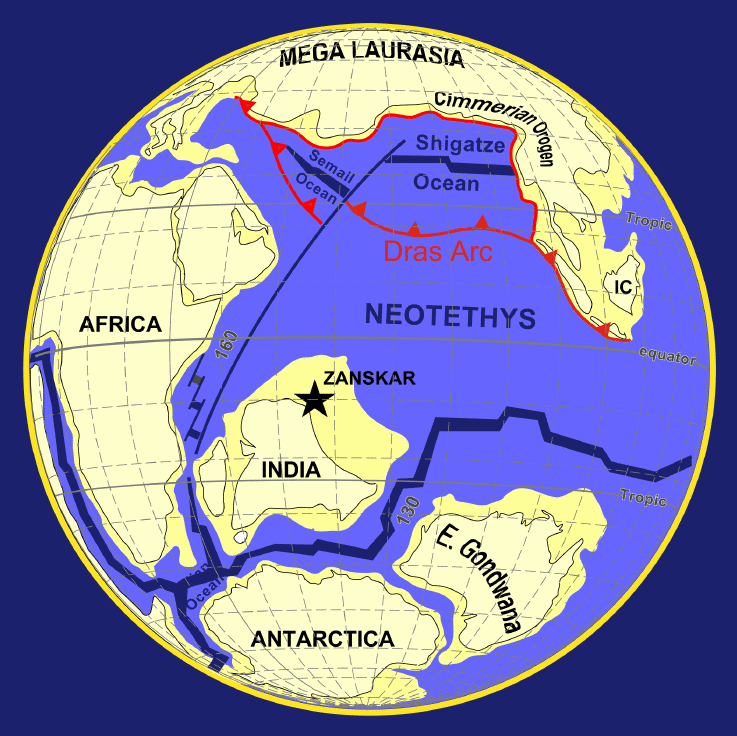
Globe showing Australia and Antarctica, approx 100 Mya

This is a list of dinosaurs whose remains have been recovered from Australia or Antarctica.

== Criteria for inclusion ==
- The genus must appear on the List of dinosaur genera.
- At least one named species of the creature must have been found in Australia or Antarctica.
- This list is a complement to Category:Dinosaurs of Australia and Category:Dinosaurs of Antarctica.

== List of Australian and Antarctic dinosaurs ==
=== Valid genera ===
Name	Year	Formation	Location	Notes	Images
Antarctopelta	2006	Snow Hill Island Formation (Late Cretaceous, Maastrichtian)	Antarctica	Possessed unusual caudal vertebrae that may have supported a "macuahuitl" as in Stegouros	
Atlascopcosaurus	1989	Eumeralla Formation (Early Cretaceous, Aptian to Albian)	Australia	Only known from remains of jaws and teeth	
Australotitan	2021	Winton Formation (Late Cretaceous, Cenomanian to Turonian)	Australia	The largest dinosaur known from Australia, comparable in size to large South American dinosaurs. Potentially a synonym of the contemporary Diamantinasaurus	
Australovenator	2009	Winton Formation (Late Cretaceous, Cenomanian)	Australia	Analysis of its arms suggests it was well-adapted to grasping	
Austrosaurus	1933	Allaru Formation (Early Cretaceous, Albian)	Australia	Its holotype was found associated with marine shells	
Cryolophosaurus	1994	Hanson Formation (Early Jurassic, Pliensbachian)	Antarctica	Had a distinctive "pompadour" crest that spanned the head from side to side	
Diamantinasaurus	2009	Winton Formation (Late Cretaceous, Cenomanian)	Australia	May have been closely related to South American titanosaurs, suggesting they dispersed to Australia via Antarctica	
Diluvicursor	2018	Eumeralla Formation (Early Cretaceous, Albian)	Australia	Lived in a prehistoric floodplain close to a high energy river	
Fostoria	2019	Griman Creek Formation (Late Cretaceous, Cenomanian)	Australia	Four individuals have been found in association	
Fulgurotherium	1932	Griman Creek Formation (Late Cretaceous, Cenomanian)	Australia	Fragmentary, but may have been an elasmarian	
Galleonosaurus	2019	Wonthaggi Formation (Early Cretaceous, Barremian)	Australia	Its upper jaw bone resembles a galleon when turned upside down	
Glacialisaurus	2007	Hanson Formation (Early Jurassic, Pliensbachian)	Antarctica	Basal yet survived late enough to coexist with true sauropods	
Imperobator	2019	Snow Hill Island Formation (Late Cretaceous, Maastrichtian)	Antarctica	Initially described as a basal paravian although it may potentially be a unenlagiine	
Kakuru	1980	Bulldog Shale (Early Cretaceous, Aptian)	Australia	Poorly known	
Kunbarrasaurus	2015	Allaru Formation, Toolebuc Formation (Early Cretaceous, Albian)	Australia	Preserves stomach contents containing ferns, fruit and seeds	
Leaellynasaura	1989	Eumeralla Formation (Early Cretaceous, Aptian to Albian)	Australia	One referred specimen has an extremely long tail. If it does belong to this genus, it would be three times as long as the rest of the body	
Minmi	1980	Bungil Formation (Early Cretaceous, Aptian)	Australia	Had long legs for an ankylosaur, possibly to help it run into bushes for protection	
Morrosaurus	2016	Snow Hill Island Formation (Late Cretaceous, Maastrichtian)	Antarctica	Closely related to Australian and South American ornithopods	
Muttaburrasaurus	1981	Allaru Formation, Mackunda Formation (Early Cretaceous to Late Cretaceous, Albian to Cenomanian)	Australia	Possessed a short oval bump on its snout originally thought to have been a sound chamber although it is now believed to belong to a modified premaxilla	
Ozraptor	1998	Colalura Sandstone (Middle Jurassic, Bajocian)	Australia	Potentially the oldest known abelisauroid	
Qantassaurus	1999	Wonthaggi Formation (Early Cretaceous, Barremian)	Australia	Distinguished from other contemporary ornithopods by its relatively short dentary	
Rapator	1932	Griman Creek Formation (Late Cretaceous, Cenomanian)	Australia	Known from only a metacarpal	
Rhoetosaurus	1926	Walloon Coal Measures (Late Jurassic, Oxfordian)	Australia	Retains four claws on its hind feet, a basal trait	
Savannasaurus	2016	Winton Formation (Late Cretaceous, Cenomanian to Turonian)	Australia	May have spent more time near water than other sauropods	
Serendipaceratops	2003	Wonthaggi Formation (Early Cretaceous, Aptian)	Australia	Possessed a robust ulna similar to that of ceratopsians and ankylosaurs, but was likely a member of the latter group	
Timimus	1993	Eumeralla Formation (Early Cretaceous, Albian)	Australia	Potentially a tyrannosauroid. If so, it would be one of the few Gondwanan members of that group	
Trinisaura	2013	Snow Hill Island Formation (Late Cretaceous, Campanian)	Antarctica	The first ornithopod named from Antarctica	
Weewarrasaurus	2018	Griman Creek Formation (Late Cretaceous, Cenomanian)	Australia	Unusually, its fossils were preserved in opal	
Wintonotitan	2009	Winton Formation (Late Cretaceous, Cenomanian)	Australia	More gracile than other contemporary titanosaurs	

=== Invalid and potentially valid genera ===
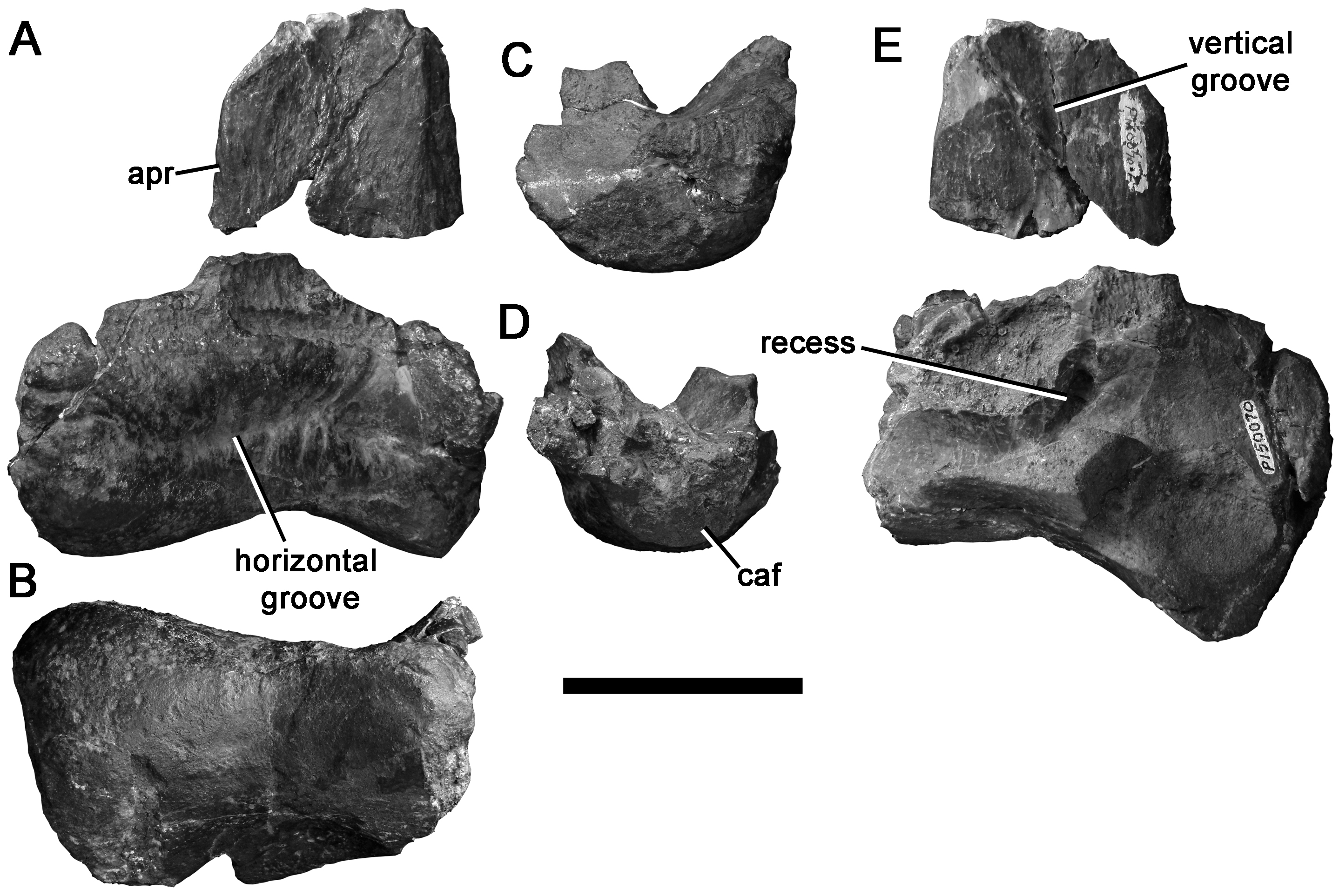
"Allosaurus robustus"

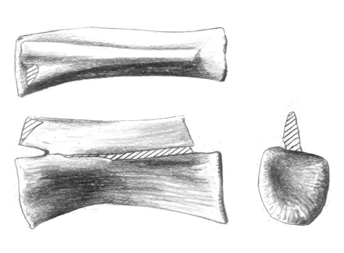
Walgettosuchus
- Agrosaurus macgillivrayi: Although originally reported as being from Australia, it may actually be from Europe, possibly being synonymous with Thecodontosaurus.
- "Allosaurus robustus": Originally described as a new species of Allosaurus, but may actually represent a megaraptoran or abelisauroid.
- "Biscoveosaurus": Said to be a large ornithopod contemporary with Morrosaurus.
- Walgettosuchus woodwardi: It has been considered synonymous with Rapator, but too little is known of both genera to be certain.

== Timeline ==
This is a timeline of selected dinosaurs from the list above. Time is measured in Ma, megaannum, along the x-axis.

== See also ==
- List of birds of Australia
- List of birds of Antarctica
