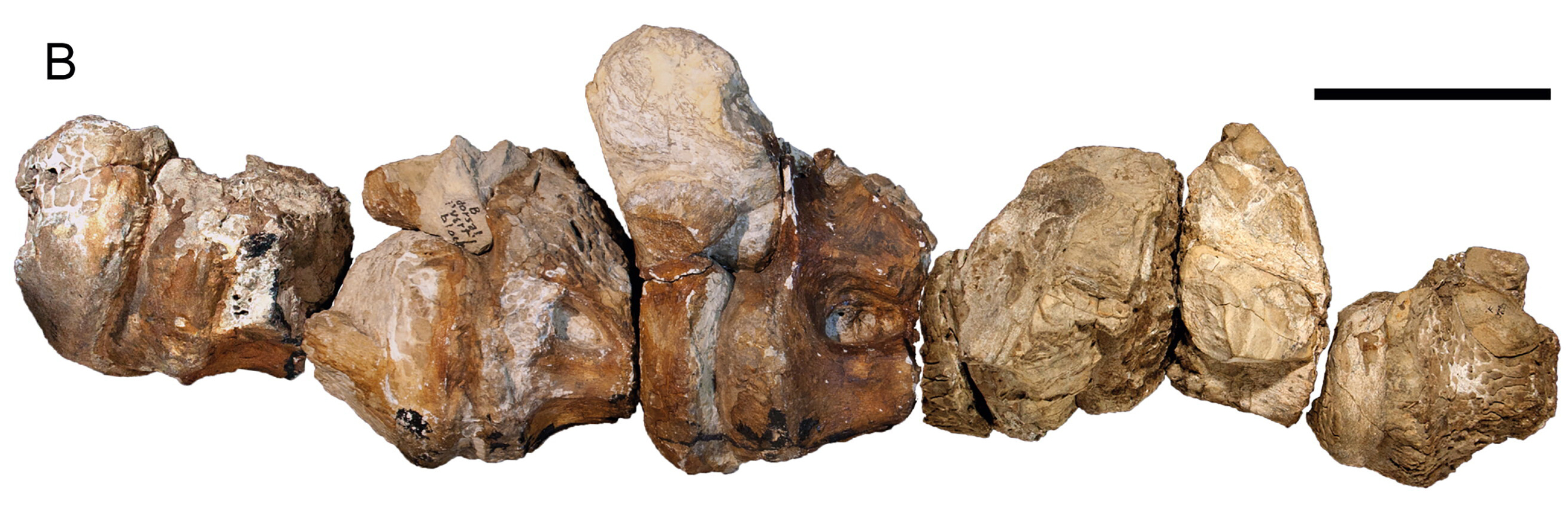
- Presacral vertebrae from the holotype

Scientific classification
- Kingdom: Animalia
- Phylum: Chordata
- Class: Reptilia
- Clade: Dinosauria
- Clade: Saurischia
- Clade: †Sauropodomorpha
- Clade: †Sauropoda
- Clade: †Macronaria
- Clade: †Somphospondyli
- Genus: †Austrosaurus; Longman, 1933

Type species
- Austrosaurus mckillopi Longman, 1933

= Austrosaurus =

Austrosaurus Temporal range: Early Cretaceous (Albian), ~112–100 Ma

Extinct genus of dinosaurs

Austrosaurus (/ˌɔːstroʊˈsɔːrəs/; lit. 'southern lizard') was an extinct genus of sauropod dinosaur from the Allaru Formation, dated to the early Cretaceous (112-100 million years ago), of Central-Western Queensland in Australia. Several specimens are known.

== Discovery and species ==
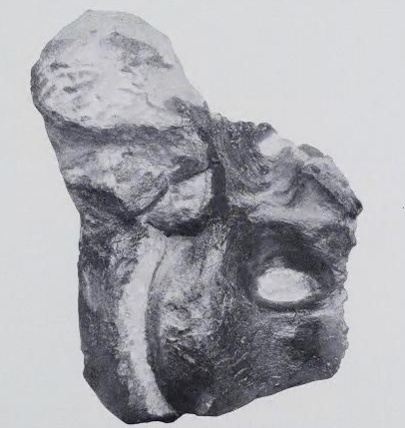
Dorsal vertebra from the holotype

The holotype, QM F2361 (consisting of three blocks containing primitive and badly weathered vertebrae and rib fragments, with a further 5 large blocks and at least 10 smaller ones later assigned to the holotype as well), was discovered by Mr. H.B. Wade on Clutha Station near Maxwelton in north Queensland in 1932, who alerted the station manager H. Mackillop, who showed his brother who sent them to the Queensland Museum. Austrosaurus was described by Heber Longman in 1933. The specimens may have transported out to sea where they were possibly scavenged by marine life such as the pliosaur known as Kronosaurus.

== Description ==
The holotype specimen (QM F2316) comprises several fragmentary presacral vertebrae preserved within blocks of matrix. These vertebrae are interpreted as belonging to the posterior cervical and anterior dorsal regions of the vertebral column, based on their proportions and laminar architecture. The centra are elongate and internally pneumatic, reflecting extensive camellate internal architecture formed by numerous small chambers produced by invasion of air sacs, a feature typical of derived titanosauriform sauropods. In at least one centrum, the internal structure consists of thin bony partitions arranged in disc-like layers parallel to the posterior articular surface, indicating a complex pneumatic internal morphology. Austrosaurus is known to have had strongly camellate internal vertebral structure.

== Paleobiology ==
Originally it was thought that sauropods spent time near or in water to relieve weight from their legs. However, this theory is now rejected and it is believed that Austrosaurus like all sauropods lived on dry land. Fossil finds suggest a height of approximately 3.9 metres at the hip and 4.1 metres at the shoulder, which would have given it an almost level back. Gregory S. Paul estimated its body size at 20 metres (66 ft) in length and 16 metric tons (18 short tons) in body mass.

== Classification ==
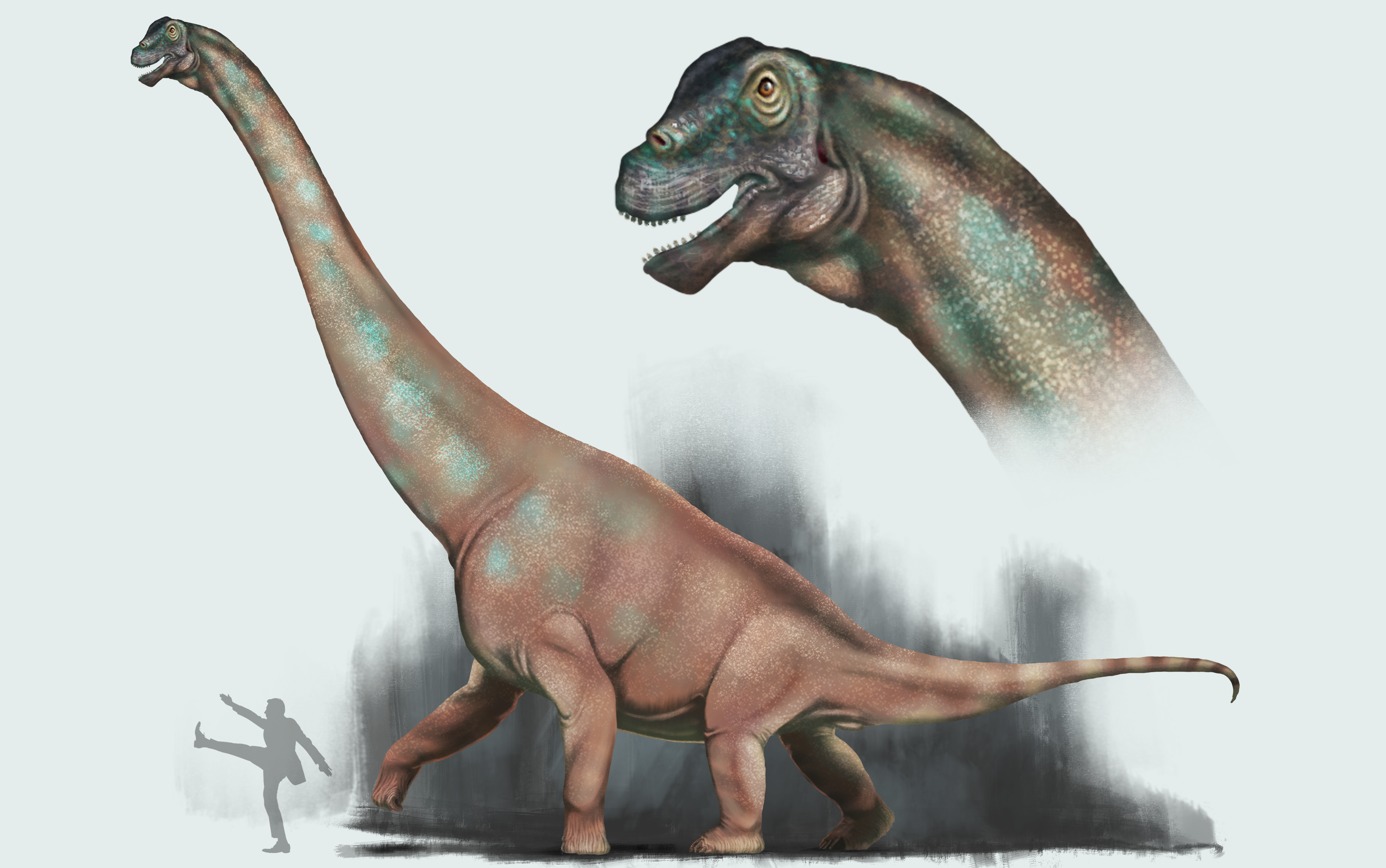
Life restoration

Initially, Austrosaurus was considered a cetiosaurid, like Patagosaurus or Shunosaurus. Hocknull et al. (2009) described the new sauropod Wintonotitan from material that originally assigned to Austrosaurus by Coombs and Molnar in 1981. Hocknull suggested that Austrosaurus mckillopi differed only slightly from the QMF 7292, the holotype of Wintonotitan wattsii, and should be considered a nomen dubium. Poropat et al. (2017) reported additional sauropod material from the Austrosaurus type locality and assigned them to the Austrosaurus holotype, finding the genus to be a valid titanosauriform tentatively assignable to Somphospondyli.

== Paleoecology ==
Austrosaurus is known from the Allaru Formation of Australia. During the Early Cretaceous, this region lay much closer to the South Pole than it does today, giving the area a relatively cool climate; winter temperatures may have dropped to around 0–5 °C. The environment was largely coastal and influenced by the nearby Eromanga Sea. Marine life in these waters included fishes such as Cooyoo and Flindersichthys, as well as the sea turtle Notochelone and the ichthyosaur Platypterygius. Other dinosaurs known from the formation include Kunbarrasaurus and Muttaburrasaurus.
