= Wallumbilla Formation =

- Stratigraphic range: Early Cretaceous (Aptian) 121.4–113.2 Ma
- Type: Geological formation
- Unit of: Rolling Downs Group
- Sub-units: Trimble Member, Ranmoor Member, Jones Valley Member, Doncaster Member, Coreena Member
- Underlies: Toolebuc & Griman Creek Formations
- Overlies: Cadna-Owie & Bungil Formations
- Thickness: 600 m (2,000 ft)

Lithology
- Primary: Mudstone, siltstone
- Other: Sandstone, limestone

Location
- Coordinates: 20.8°S 143.7°E
- Approximate paleocoordinates: 60.2°S 124.4°E
- Region: New South Wales; Northern Territory; Queensland; South Australia
- Country: Australia
- Extent: Eromanga Basin
- Wallumbilla Formation (Australia) Wallumbilla Formation (Queensland)

The Wallumbilla Formation is an Aptian geologic formation found in Australia. Remains of marine reptiles, a theropod and various invertebrates are among the fossils that have been recovered from its strata.

== Description ==
The formation is present in the Northern Territory, Queensland, South Australia, and New South Wales. It is a sedimentary unit, principally made up of sandstone, limestone, mudstone and siltstone, with calcareous concretions. Its maximum thickness is 600 metres. It dates back to the Aptian epochs, about 121.4 and 113.2 million years ago, based on dinoflagellete cyst dating, where Odontochitina operculata and Diconodinium davidii have been biocorrelated to the Aptian.

The Wallumbilla Formation is part of the Wilgunya Subgroup, which in turn is part of the Rolling Downs Group of the Eromanga and Surat Basins. The named beds comprise of the Coreena, Doncaster, Jones Valley, Ranmoor, and Trimble Members. The formation outlines the appearance of a shallow marine environment over the earlier terrestrial deposits in the Carpentaria, Laura, Eromanga and Surat basins. Economically, it provides the main seal to the Great Artesian Basin. It is of notable significance as a potential seal for the geological storage of CO_{2}.

== Paleobiota ==
Color key: Taxon / Reclassified taxon / Taxon falsely reported as present / Dubious taxon or junior synonym / Ichnotaxon / Ootaxon / Morphotaxon

Notes
Uncertain or tentative taxa are in small text
~~crossed out~~ taxa are discredited.

=== Reptiles ===
Reptiles of the Wallumbilla Formation
Genus	Species	Clade	Image
Kronosaurus	sp. indet.	Plesiosauria, Pliosauridae	Size comparison of Kronosaurus.
Platypterygius	cf. P. sp.	Ichthyosauria, Ophthalmosauridae	Fossil skeleton of the related P. australis.
Elasmosauridae indet. (Formerly Woolungasaurus glendowerensis)	sp. indet.	Plesiosauria, Elasmosauridae	
Plesiosauria indet.	sp. indet.	Plesiosauria, incertae sedis	
Polycotylidae indet.	sp. indet.	Plesiosauria, Polycotylidae	
Theropoda indet.	sp. indet.	Theropoda, incertae sedis	

=== Ammonites ===
Ammonites of the Wallumbilla Formation
Genus	Species	Clade	Image
Aconeceras	A. sp.	Ammonitida, Oppeliidae	Fossil of the related A. nisus.
Australiceras	A. irregulare	Ammonitida, Ancyloceratidae	Life reconstruction of the related A. sp.
Australiceras	A. jacki	Ammonitida, Ancyloceratidae	Life reconstruction of the related A. sp.
Sanmartinoceras	S. olene	Ammonitida, Oppeliidae	
Tonohamites	T. taylori	Ammonitida, Ancyloceratidae	
Tropaeum	T. undatum	Ammonitida, Ancyloceratidae	Reconstruction of the related T. imperator.

=== Bivalves ===
Bivalves of the Wallumbilla Formation
Genus	Species	Clade	Image
Eyrena	E. palmerensis	Mytilida, Mytilidae	
Fissilunula	F. clarkei	Cardiida, Glossidae	
Maccoyella	M. barkleyi	Pectinida, Oxytomidae	
Pinna	P. sp.	Pteriida, Pinnidae	Pinna internal and external shell anatomy.
Pseudavicula	P. anomala	Pectinida, Oxytomidae	

=== Gastropods ===
Gastropods of the Wallumbilla Formation
Genus	Species	Clade	Image
Notopala	N. albascopularis	Architaenioglossa, Viviparidae	

=== Microfossils ===
==== Foraminifera ====
Foraminifera of the Wallumbilla Formation
Genus	Species	Clade	Image
Ammobaculites	A. australis	Foraminifera, agglutinated	
Ammobaculites	A. humei	Foraminifera, agglutinated	
Ammodiscus	A. sp.	Foraminifera, agglutinated	
Bigenerina	B. pitmani	Foraminifera, agglutinated	
Haplophragmoides	H. sp.	Foraminifera, agglutinated	
Hippocrepina	H. barksdalei	Foraminifera, agglutinated	
Hyperammina	H. gaultina	Foraminifera, agglutinated	
Labrospira	L. nonioninoides	Foraminifera, agglutinated	
Pseudobolivina	P. coonanaensis	Foraminifera, agglutinated	
Pseudobolivina	P. manitobensis	Foraminifera, agglutinated	
Trochammina	cf. T. gatesensis	Foraminifera, agglutinated	
Trochammina	T. minuta	Foraminifera, agglutinated	
Verneuilinoides	V. neocomiensis	Foraminifera, agglutinated	
Bilingulogavelinella	B. australis	Foraminifera, Rotaliida	
Dentalina	D. hamiltonensis	Foraminifera, Rotaliida	
Gavelinella	G. sp.	Foraminifera, Rotaliida	
Globulina	G. lacrima	Foraminifera, Rotaliida	
Lenticulina	L. australiensis	Foraminifera, Rotaliida	
Lenticulina	L. gunderbookaensis	Foraminifera, Rotaliida	
Lingulogavelinella	L. albiensis subsp. cf. biconvexa	Foraminifera, Rotaliida	
Marginulinopsis	M. crespinae	Foraminifera, Rotaliida	
Miliolinella	M. australiana	Foraminifera, Miliolida	
Pseudonodosaria	P. sp.	Foraminifera, Rotaliida	
Sarasenaria	S. planiuscula	Foraminifera, Rotaliida	

==== Radiolaria ====
Radiolarians of the Wallumbilla Formation
Genus	Species	Clade	Image
Arachnosphaera	A. exilis	Spumellaria, incertae sedis	
Archaeospongoprunum	A. tehamaensis	Spumellaria, incertae sedis	
Archaeospongoprunum	A. sp. A	Spumellaria, incertae sedis	
Archaeospongoprunum	A. sp. B	Spumellaria, incertae sedis	
Cenosphaera	C. sp. A	Spumellaria, incertae sedis	
Crucella	cf. C. messinae	Spumellaria, Hagiastridae	
Crucella	C. sp. A	Spumellaria, Hagiastridae	
Haliomma	H. sp. A	Spumellaria, incertae sedis	
Paronaella	P. sp. A	Spumellaria, Hagiastridae	
Patulibracchium?	P.? sp. A	Spumellaria, Hagiastridae	
Patulibracchium?	P.? sp. B	Spumellaria, Hagiastridae	
Spongodiscus	S. sp. A	Spumellaria, incertae sedis	
Spongotripus	S. sp. A	Spumellaria, incertae sedis	
Spongotripus	S. sp. B	Spumellaria, incertae sedis	
Spongotrochus	cf. S. polygonatus	Spumellaria, incertae sedis	
Staurosphaera	S. sp. A	Spumellaria, incertae sedis	
Triactoma	T. sp. A	Spumellaria, incertae sedis	
Triactoma	T. sp. B	Spumellaria, incertae sedis	
Xiphosphaera	cf. A. umbilicata	Spumellaria, Actinommidae	
Xiphosphaera	X. sp. A	Spumellaria, Actinommidae	
Dictyomitra	cf. D. brouweri	Nassellaria, incertae sedis	
Dictyomitra	cf. D. sp. A (Foreman (1975))	Nassellaria, incertae sedis	
Dictyomitra	D. sp. B	Nassellaria, incertae sedis	
Dictyomitra	D. sp. C	Nassellaria, incertae sedis	
Dictyophimus	D. sp. A	Nassellaria, incertae sedis	
Gongylothorax	G. verbeeki	Nassellaria, incertae sedis	
Lithomelissa	L. sp. A	Nassellaria, incertae sedis	
Lithostrobus	L. sp. A	Nassellaria, incertae sedis	
Lithostrobus	L. sp. B	Nassellaria, incertae sedis	
Lithostrobus	L. sp. C	Nassellaria, incertae sedis	
Lithostrobus	L. sp. D	Nassellaria, incertae sedis	
Lychnocanium?	L.? sp. A	Nassellaria, incertae sedis	
Lychnocanium?	L.? sp. B	Nassellaria, incertae sedis	
Psilomelissa	P. sp. A	Nassellaria, incertae sedis	
Solenotryma	S. sp. A	Nassellaria, incertae sedis	
Stichocapsa	S. sp. A	Nassellaria, incertae sedis	
Theocorys	T. antiqua	Nassellaria, incertae sedis	
Hagiastridae indet.	sp. A	Spumellaria, Hagiastridae	
Sponguridae indet.	sp. A	Spumellaria, Sponguridae	
Theopiliidae indet.	sp. A	Nassellaria, Theopiliidae	
Triacartidae indet.	sp. A	Nassellaria, Triacartidae	

==== Other invertebrates ====
Diatoms and ostracods of the Wallumbilla Formation
Genus	Species	Clade	Image
Cladogramma	C. simplex	Diatom, incertae sedis	
Krithe	K.? sp.	Ostracoda, incertae sedis	
Diatom indet.	morphotype A	Diatom, incertae sedis	
Diatom indet.	morphotype B	Diatom, incertae sedis	
Diatom indet.	morphotype C	Diatom, incertae sedis	
Diatom indet.	morphotype D	Diatom, incertae sedis	
Diatom indet.	morphotype E	Diatom, incertae sedis	
Diatom indet.	morphotype F	Diatom, incertae sedis	

=== Dinoflagellates ===
Dinoflagellates of the Wallumbilla Formation
Genus	Species	Clade	Image
Apteodinium	A. granulatum	Dinoflagellate	
Ascodinium	A. sp.	Dinoflagellate	
Astrocysta	A. cretacea	Dinoflagellate	
Broomea	"B." jaegeri	Dinoflagellate	
Broomea	"B." micropoda	Dinoflagellate	
Callaiosphaeridium	C. asymmetricum	Dinoflagellate	
Canningia	C. colliveri	Dinoflagellate	
Canninginopsis	cf. C. denticulata	Dinoflagellate	
Canninginopsis	C. sp. A	Dinoflagellate	
Carpodinium	C. granulatum	Dinoflagellate	
Chlamydophorella	C. nyei	Dinoflagellate	
Chlamydophorella	C. sp. A	Dinoflagellate	
Cleistosphaeridium	C. huguonioti	Dinoflagellate	
Cleistosphaeridium	C. polypes	Dinoflagellate	
Coronifera	C. oceanica	Dinoflagellate	
Cribroperidinium	C. muderongensis	Dinoflagellate	
Diconodinium	D. davidii	Dinoflagellate	
Diconodinium	D. sp.	Dinoflagellate	
Dingodinium	D. cerviculum	Dinoflagellate	
Endoscrinium	E. campanulum	Dinoflagellate	
Exochosphaeridium	E. phragmites	Dinoflagellate	
Fromea	F. amphora	Dinoflagellate	
Gardodinium	cf. G. deflandrei	Dinoflagellate	
Gonyaulacysta	G. sp.	Dinoflagellate	
Hystrichosphaeridium	H. recurvatum	Dinoflagellate	
Hystrichosphaeridium	cf. H. arundum	Dinoflagellate	
Leptodinium	L. sp.	Dinoflagellate	
Microdinium	M. sp. A	Dinoflagellate	
Microdinium	M. spp. (2 species)	Dinoflagellate	
Muderongia	M. staurota	Dinoflagellate	
Muderongia	M. tetracantha	Dinoflagellate	
Odontochitina	O. operculata	Dinoflagellate	
Oligosphaeridium	O. pulcherrimum	Dinoflagellate	
Oligosphaeridium	O. sp.	Dinoflagellate	
Ovoidinium	O. cinctum	Dinoflagellate	
Pareodinia	P. aphelia	Dinoflagellate	
Prolixosphaeridium	P. sp.	Dinoflagellate	
Pterodinium	P. cornutum	Dinoflagellate	
Pterodinium	P. magnoserratum	Dinoflagellate	
Rhombodella	R. natans	Dinoflagellate	
Scriniodinium	S. sp.	Dinoflagellate	
Spiniferites	S. cingulatus	Dinoflagellate	
Spiniferites	S. cingulatus reticulatus	Dinoflagellate	
Spiniferites	S. pterotus	Dinoflagellate	
Spiniferites	S. ramosus	Dinoflagellate	
Stephodinium	S. sp. A	Dinoflagellate	
Tanyosphaeridium	T. sp.	Dinoflagellate	
Tenua	T. hystricella	Dinoflagellate	
Tenua	T. sp.	Dinoflagellate	
Trichodinium	T. castanea	Dinoflagellate	

=== Acritarchs ===
Acritarchs of the Wallumbilla Formation
Genus	Species	Clade	Image
Baltisphaeridium	B. fimbriatum	Acritarch	
Leiofusa	L. jurassica	Acritarch	
Leiosphaeridia	L. sp. A	Acritarch	
Micrhystridium	M. fragile	Acritarch	
Micrhystridium	M. inconspicuum	Acritarch	
Micrhystridium	M. piliferum	Acritarch	
Micrhystridium	M. stellatum	Acritarch	
Pterospermella	P. australiensis	Acritarch	
Schizosporis	S. reticulatus	Acritarch	
Veryhachium	V. europaeum	Acritarch	
Veryhachium	V. lairdi	Acritarch	
Veryhachium	V. metum	Acritarch	
Veryhachium	V. reductum	Acritarch	
Veryhachium	V. spp. (2 species)	Acritarch	

=== Spores and pollen ===
Spores and pollen of the Wallumbilla Formation
Genus	Species	Clade	Image
Appendicisporites	A. sp.	Spores	
Baculatisporites	B. comaumensis	Spores	
Ceratosporites	C. equalis	Spores	
Cicatricosisporites	C. australiensis	Spores	
Concavissimisporites	C. spp. (4 species)	Spores	
Contignisporites	C. fornicatus	Spores	
Crybelosporites	C. stylosus	Spores	
Cyathidites	C. australis	Spores	
Cyathidites	C. minor	Spores	
Cyclosporites	C. hughesii	Spores	
Deltoidospora	D. juncta	Spores	
Dictyotosporites	D. speciosus	Spores	
Foraminisporis	F. wonthaggiensis	Spores	
Gleicheniidites	G. circinidites-senonicus complex	Spores	
Gleicheniidites	G. simplex	Spores	
Klukisporites	K. scaberis	Spores	
Leptolepidites	L. major	Spores	
Leptolepidites	L. verrucatus	Spores	
Lycopodiacidites	L. canaliculatus	Spores	
Lycopodiumsporites	L. austroclavatidites	Spores	
Lycopodiumsporites	L. circolumenus	Spores	
Lycopodiumsporites	L. facetus	Spores	
Lycopodiumsporites	L. marginatus	Spores	
Lycopodiumsporites	L. nodosus	Spores	
Lycopodiumsporites	L. sp.	Spores	
Neoraistrickia	N. truncata	Spores	
Patellasporites	cf. P. distaverrucosus	Spores	
Pilosisporites	P. notensis	Spores	
Sestrosporites	S. pseudoalveolatus	Spores	
Stereisporites	S. antiquasporites	Spores	
Alisporites	A. grandis	Pollen	
Alisporites	A. similis	Pollen	
Alisporites	A. spp. (2 species)	Pollen	
Classopollis	C. classoides	Pollen	
Cycadopites	C. fragilis	Pollen	
Cycadopites	C. sp.	Pollen	
Microcachryidites	M. antarcticus	Pollen	
Podocarpidites	P. biformis	Pollen	
Podocarpidites	P. dettmanni	Pollen	
Podocarpidites	P. ellipticus	Pollen	
Podocarpidites	cf. P. multesimus	Pollen	
Podocarpidites	P. spp. (2 species)	Pollen	
Trisaccites	T. microsaccatus	Pollen	
Tsugaepollenites	T. trilobatus	Pollen	
Tsugaepollenites	T. dampieri	Pollen	
Vitreisporites	V. pallidus	Pollen	
Vitreisporites	V. sp.	Pollen	

== See also ==
- Plesiosaur stratigraphic distribution
- South Polar region of the Cretaceous
