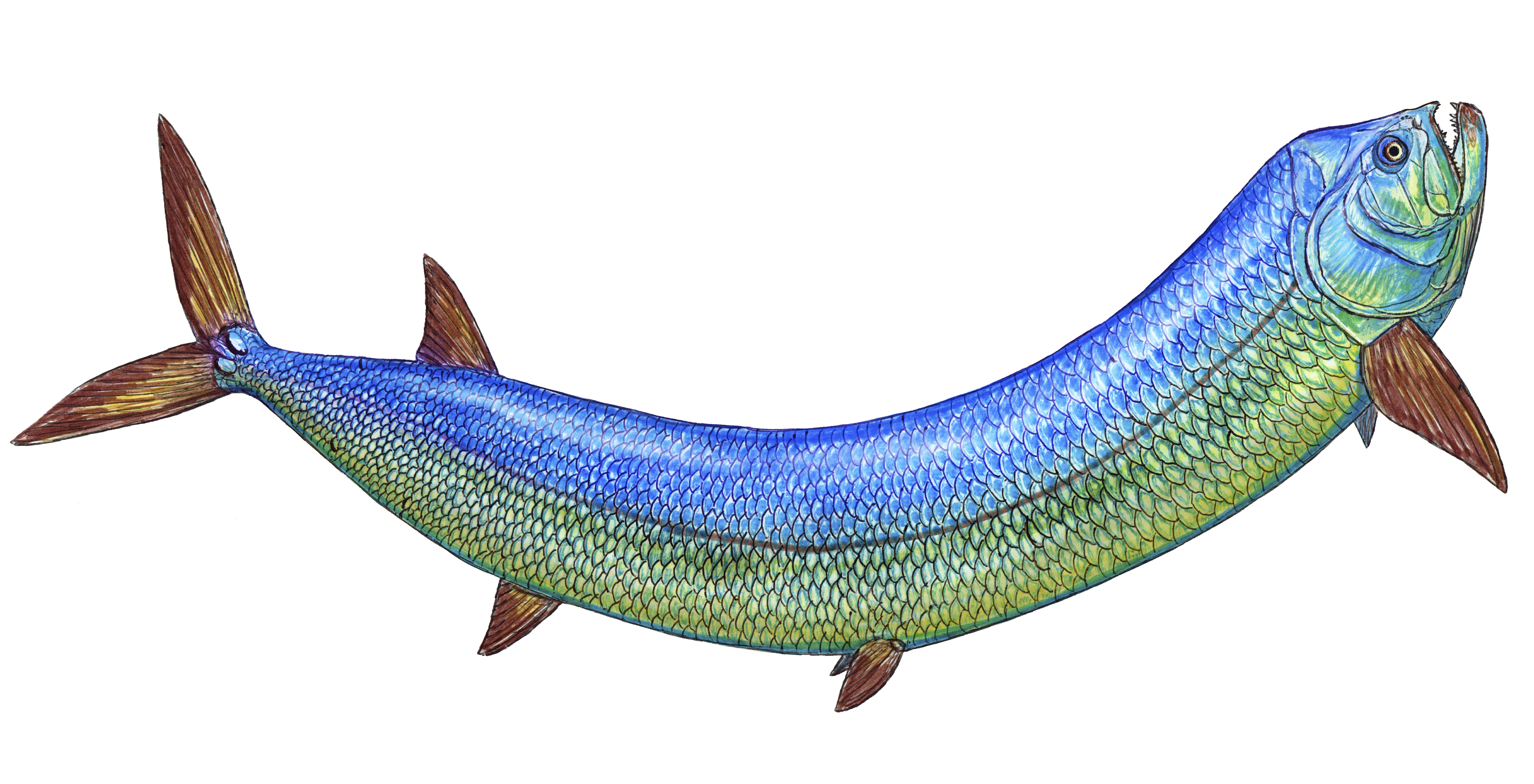
- Reconstruction according to specimen "Wandah"

Scientific classification
- Kingdom: Animalia
- Phylum: Chordata
- Class: Actinopterygii
- Order: †Ichthyodectiformes
- Family: †Ichthyodectidae
- Genus: †Cooyoo; Bartholomai & Lees, 1987
- Species: †C. australis

Binomial name
- †Cooyoo australis (Woodward, 1894)

Synonyms
- †Portheus australis Woodward, 1894; †Xiphactinus australis (Woodward, 1894)

= Cooyoo =

Cooyoo Temporal range: Late Albian

Extinct genus of ray-finned fishes

Cooyoo ("fish" in the Yirandhali language) is an extinct genus of ichthyodectid ray-finned fish known from the Lower Cretaceous. It contains a single species, C. australis, known from the Albian-aged Toolebuc and Allaru Formations of Queensland, Australia. C. australis was originally named by Arthur Smith Woodward as a species of Portheus (now a probable synonym of Xiphactinus) in 1894, which was later amended to Xiphactinus.

Some phylogenetic studies have recovered it as an indeterminate ichthyodectiform, but later ones have found it to either be a sister of Unamichthys, or more recently a true ichthyodectid related to Ichthyodectes.

Cooyoo was a dominant predator of the Eromanga Sea. As with all other ichthyodectids, it was a predator of smaller fish, and had large conical teeth to easily catch them. In contrast, Cooyoo itself was a prey item for larger animals, as a skull has been found with potentially fatal bite marks, which are referable to a polycotylid plesiosaur, an ornithocheiroid pterosaur, or most likely the ichthyosaur Platypterygius.

Cooyoo was initially described from a complete specimen with length about 1.1 metres (3.6 ft), and other fossil remains have been found including near-complete skulls. In 2011, a 2.5 metres (8.2 ft) long intact fossil, nicknamed "Wandah", was discovered in north-west Queensland. According to Rob Levers, Kronosaurus Korner museum founder and chairman, it was possible to detect the fish in the stomach of that specimen. Cooyoo is the largest bony fish known from the Eromanga Sea.
