= Flindersichthys =

Flindersichthys Temporal range: mid-late Albian

Scientific classification
- Kingdom: Animalia
- Phylum: Chordata
- Class: Actinopterygii
- Division: Teleostei
- Order: Elopiformes
- Genus: †Flindersichthys; Longman, 1932
- Species: †F. denmeadi

Binomial name
- †Flindersichthys denmeadi Longman, 1932

Extinct genus of fishes

Flindersichthys is an extinct genus of prehistoric marine ray-finned fish that lived during the Albian stage of the Early Cretaceous epoch. It contains a single species, F. denmeadi, known from the Allaru and Toolebuc Formations of Queensland, Australia. It was a relative of modern ladyfish and tarpons.

== Description ==
Flindersichthys was a large fish growing over 1.25 meters long and with an estimated body depth of over 30 centimeters. The holotype specimen, QMF2210, is a nearly complete skull found near the Flinders River, one mile east of Richmond, Queensland, in the sediments of the Toolebuc Formation. Several other specimens are also known, mostly from the Toolebuc Formation, though some are from the Allaru and Normanton formations. It is assigned to the Elopiformes order, but while it shares some features with megalopids it is considered incertae sedis below this level. Judging from its dentition and the fact that the specimen QMF13720 has small, isolated vertebrae of a teleost fish in the mouth, Flindersichthys is believed to be a predator of smaller fish. It also had a large jaw with an underbite, possibly allowing it to swallow small prey whole.

== See also ==
- Prehistoric fish
- List of prehistoric bony fish
