= Cleistosphaeridium =

Scientific classification
- Domain: Eukaryota
- (unranked): SAR
- (unranked): Alveolata
- Phylum: Dinoflagellata
- Class: Dinophyceae
- Order: Gonyaulacales
- Family: incertae sedis
- Genus: Cleistosphaeridium Davey et al., 1966

Genus of protists (fossil)

Cleistosphaeridium is a genus of dinoflagellates in the order Gonyaulacales.

== Species ==
- Cleistosphaeridium aciculare
- Cleistosphaeridium actinocoronatum
- Cleistosphaeridium ambiguum
- Cleistosphaeridium ancoriferum
- Cleistosphaeridium ancyreum
- Cleistosphaeridium araneosum
- Cleistosphaeridium armatum
- Cleistosphaeridium ashdodense
- Cleistosphaeridium australe
- Cleistosphaeridium baculatum
- Cleistosphaeridium bahiaense
- Cleistosphaeridium bergmannii
- Cleistosphaeridium bifide
- Cleistosphaeridium bifurcatum
- Cleistosphaeridium brevibaculum
- Cleistosphaeridium brevispinosum
- Cleistosphaeridium bulbum
- Cleistosphaeridium centrocarpum
- Cleistosphaeridium cephalum
- Cleistosphaeridium clavulum
- Cleistosphaeridium commixtum
- Cleistosphaeridium danicum
- Cleistosphaeridium deflandrei
- Cleistosphaeridium digitale
- Cleistosphaeridium disjunctum
- Cleistosphaeridium diversispinosum
- Cleistosphaeridium echinoides
- Cleistosphaeridium ehrenbergii
- Cleistosphaeridium elegans He Chengquan 1991
- Cleistosphaeridium elegans He Chengquan, Zhu Shenzhao and Jin Guangxing in He Chengquan et al. 1989
- Cleistosphaeridium eocenicum
- Cleistosphaeridium erectum
- Cleistosphaeridium flexuosum
- Cleistosphaeridium fungosum
- Cleistosphaeridium furcillatum
- Cleistosphaeridium garampaniense
- Cleistosphaeridium giganteum
- Cleistosphaeridium granulatum
- Cleistosphaeridium hallembayense
- Cleistosphaeridium heteracanthum
- Cleistosphaeridium huguoniotii
- Cleistosphaeridium iaculigerum
- Cleistosphaeridium insolitum
- Cleistosphaeridium israelianum
- Cleistosphaeridium lacustre
- Cleistosphaeridium laxabaculum
- Cleistosphaeridium leve
- Cleistosphaeridium lumectum
- Cleistosphaeridium machaerophorum
- Cleistosphaeridium mediterraneum
- Cleistosphaeridium microcystum
- Cleistosphaeridium mikirii
- Cleistosphaeridium minus
- Cleistosphaeridium mojsisovicsii
- Cleistosphaeridium multifurcatum
- Cleistosphaeridium multifurcillatum
- Cleistosphaeridium multispinosum
- Cleistosphaeridium nanus
- Cleistosphaeridium nenjiangense
- Cleistosphaeridium oligacanthum
- Cleistosphaeridium panniforme
- Cleistosphaeridium panshanense
- Cleistosphaeridium parvum
- Cleistosphaeridium patagonicum
- Cleistosphaeridium paucifurcatum
- Cleistosphaeridium pectiniforme
- Cleistosphaeridium perforoconum
- Cleistosphaeridium pilosum
- Cleistosphaeridium placacanthum
- Cleistosphaeridium polyacanthum
- Cleistosphaeridium polyozum
- Cleistosphaeridium polypes
- Cleistosphaeridium polypetellum
- Cleistosphaeridium polytrichum
- Cleistosphaeridium radiculopse
- Cleistosphaeridium regulatum
- Cleistosphaeridium reticuloideum
- Cleistosphaeridium sarmentum
- Cleistosphaeridium selseyense
- Cleistosphaeridium separatum
- Cleistosphaeridium shandongense
- Cleistosphaeridium sijuense
- Cleistosphaeridium solidum
- Cleistosphaeridium sphericum
- Cleistosphaeridium spinosum
- Cleistosphaeridium spinulastrum
- Cleistosphaeridium spiralisetum
- Cleistosphaeridium spissum
- Cleistosphaeridium tenue
- Cleistosphaeridium tenuifilum
- Cleistosphaeridium tianshanense
- Cleistosphaeridium tiara
- Cleistosphaeridium tribuliferum
- Cleistosphaeridium uncinispinosum
- Cleistosphaeridium varispinosum
- Cleistosphaeridium williamsii
- Cleistosphaeridium xinjiangense
