= Toolebuc Formation =

Geological formation in Australia

- Stratigraphic range: Early Cretaceous (Albian) 113.2–100.5 Ma
- Type: Geological formation
- Unit of: Rolling Downs Group
- Underlies: Allaru Formation
- Overlies: Wallumbilla Formation
- Thickness: At least 10 metres (33 ft)

Lithology
- Primary: Chalk
- Other: Calcite

Location
- Coordinates: 20.4°S 144.4°E
- Approximate paleocoordinates: 52.7°S 132.5°E
- Region: Queensland
- Country: Australia
- Extent: Eromanga Basin
- Toolebuc Formation (Australia) Toolebuc Formation (Queensland)

The Toolebuc Formation is a geological formation that extends from Queensland across South Australia and the Northern Territory in Australia, whose strata date back to the Albian stage of the Early Cretaceous. Dinosaurs, pterosaurs, plesiosaurs, ichthyosaurs, protostegid turtles, sharks, chimaeroids and bony fish remains are among the fossils that have been recovered from the formation.

== Deposition ==
The Toolebuc Formation is a rather condensed section that was formed during a rise in sea level. The environment in which the strata of the formation were laid was a shallow sea, the Eromanga Sea, which had a lush growth of planktic algae within the photic zone in bottom anoxic waters. Coccoliths and organic matter were transported rapidly in fecal pellets originating from organisms who were feeding in the surface waters. The transition from a shallow sea fauna to a benthic fauna within fine-grained silica-bearing rocks reflects the encroachment of shorelines and better oxygenated bottom waters with the occurrence with a fall in sea level.

== Lithology ==
The Toolebuc Formation is primarily a thin, laterally continuous chalk, occurring across a thick section of fine-grained clastics within the Eromanga Basin in Queensland. In the JCD-6 core from the Julia Creek area of Esso Australia (now ExxonMobil Australia), the Toolebuc consists of 10 metres (33 ft) of interbedded chalk and Inoceramus-rich coquinite. Thin, fossiliferous lag deposits occur at the bases of each unit.

There is little evidence of diagenesis in the Toolebuc Formation, other than physical compaction. Within the chalk are well preserved, low-magnesium calcite coccoliths, coccospheres, and immature amorphous kerogen. In the lower laminated half of the Toolebuc, the chalk averages about 50% calcite, 10% quartz, 10% clay minerals and 7% pyrite. Whereas in the upper, Inoceramus-rich chalk, the composition is similar to the lower strata, but with a slightly higher proportion of calcite and clay, and a reduced percentage of organic matter. Additionally, the Toolebuc Formation is enriched by two orders of magnitude in heavy metals, in comparison with average limestone and shale. The abundance of said elements is correlated well with the abundance of organic matter, in exception to the elevated levels of uranium associated with apatite in lag deposits.

== Paleobiota ==
Color key: Taxon / Reclassified taxon / Taxon falsely reported as present / Dubious taxon or junior synonym / Ichnotaxon / Ootaxon / Morphotaxon

Notes
Uncertain or tentative taxa are in small text
~~crossed out~~ taxa are discredited.

=== Dinosaurs ===
Dinosaurs of the Toolebuc Formation
Genus	Species	Notes	Image
Kunbarrasaurus	cf. K. sp.	Ankylosauria, Parankylosauria	Fossilized skeleton of K. ieversi (Allaru F.)
Nanantius	N. eos	Enantiornithes, incertae sedis	Bones of N. eos.
Tenuicruris	T. piscanexum	Enantiornithes, incertae sedis	Life restoration of T. piscanexum.
Enantiornithean indet.	Indeterminate	Enantiornithes, incertae sedis	Indeterminate enantiornithean remains.
Titanosauriformes indet. ("Hughenden sauropod")	sp. indet	Sauropodomorpha, Titanosauriformes	

=== Fishes ===
Fishes of the Toolebuc Formation
Genus	Species	Clade	Image
Canaryichthys	C. rozefeldsi	?Ionoscopiformes, incertae sedis	
Ceratodus	C. diutinus	Ceratodontiformes, Ceratodontidae	Reconstruction of C. sp.
Cooyoo	C. australis	Ichthyodectiformes, Ichthyodectidae	Restoration of C. australis.
Dugaldia	D. emmilta	Ichthyodectiformes, incertae sedis	
Euroka	E. dunravenensis	Elopiformes, Eurokidae	
Flindersichthys	F. denmeadi	Elopiformes, incertae sedis	
Marathonichthys	M. coyleorum	Albuliformes, incertae sedis	
Pachyrhizodus	P. grawi	Crossognathiformes Pachyrhizodontidae	Restoration of the related P. caninus.
Pachyrhizodus	P. marathonensis	Crossognathiformes Pachyrhizodontidae	Restoration of the related P. caninus.
Protosphyraena	P. hurleyi (Formerly Australopachycormus hurleyi)	Pachycormiformes, Protosphyraenidae	
?Pseudocorax	P. sp.	Lamniformes, Pseudocoracidae	
Ptyktoptychion	P. tayyo	Chimaeriformes, Callorhinchidae	
Richmondichthys	R. sweeti	Aspidorhynchiformes, Aspidorhynchidae	Sketch of R. sweeti holotype.
Stewartichthys	S. leichhardti	?Albuliformes, incertae sedis	
Cardabiodontidae indet.	sp. indet.	Lamniformes, Cardabiodontidae	
Teleostei indet. (Formerly Pristiophorus)	sp. indet. (Formerly P. tumidens)	Teleostei, incertae sedis	

=== Marine reptiles ===
Marine reptiles of the Toolebuc Formation
Genus	Species	Clade	Image
Bouliachelys	B. suteri	Testudines, Protostegidae	Partial fossil skull of B. suteri.
Cratochelone	C. berneyi	Testudines, Protostegidae	Fossil of C. berneyi.
Eromangasaurus	E. australis	Plesiosauria, Elasmosauridae	Life restoration of E. australis.
Kronosaurus	K. queenslandicus	Plesiosauria, Pliosauridae	Reconstruction of K. queenslandicus.
Notochelone	N. costata	Testudines, Protostegidae	Reconstruction of N. costata.
Platypterygius	"P." australis	Ichthyosauria, Ophthalmosauridae	Reconstruction of P. australis.
Polycotylidae indet.	sp. indet.	Plesiosauria, Polycotylidae	

=== Pterosaurs ===
Pterosaurs of the Toolebuc Formation
Genus	Species	Notes	Image
Aussiedraco	A. molnari	Ornithocheiromorpha, Targaryendraconidae	Aussiedraco skull restoration based on Barbosania.
Haliskia	H. peterseni	Ornithocheiromorpha, Anhangueridae	Life restoration of H. peterseni.
Mythunga	M. camara	Ornithocheiromorpha, Anhangueridae	
Thapunngaka	T. shawi	Ornithocheiromorpha, Ornithocheiridae	
Anhangueridae indet.	sp. indet.	Ornithocheiromorpha, Anhangueridae	
Anhangueria indet.	sp. indet.	Ornithocheiromorpha, incertae sedis	

=== Cephalopods ===
Cephalopods of the Toolebuc Formation
Genus	Species	Clade	Image
Beudanticeras	B. flindersi	Ammonitida, Desmoceratidae	
Boreopeltis	B. soniae	Octopodiformes, Plesioteuthididae	
Enchoteuthis	E. tonii (Formerly Muensterella tonii)	Octopoda, Muensterellidae	Reconstruction of the related E. melanae.
Eutrephoceras	E. hendersoni	Nautilida, Nautilidae	Fossil of the related E. dekayi.
Idanoceras	I. sp.	Ammonitida, Labeceratidae	
Labeceras	L. spp.	Ammonitida, Labeceratidae	
Myloceras	M. spp.	Ammonitida, Labeceratidae	
Trachyteuthis	T. willisi	Vampyromorpha, Trachyteuthididae	Reconstruction of the related T. hastiformis.

=== Other invertebrates ===
Other invertebrates of the Toolebuc Formation
Genus	Species	Clade	Images
Aucellina	A. hughendenensis	Pectinida, Buchiidae	
Brunnaega	B. tomhurleyi	Isopoda, Cirolanidae	
Inoceramus	I. sutherlandi	Pteriida, Inoceramidae	Fossil of the related Inoceramus cycloides.

== See also ==
- List of dinosaur-bearing rock formations
- Paja Formation, Kronosaurus and Platypterygius Lagerstätte in Colombia
- Sierra Madre Formation, contemporaneous fossiliferous formation of Mexico
- Santana Group, contemporaneous Lagerstätte in northeastern Brazil
  - Crato Formation
  - Romualdo Formation
