= Allaru Formation =

Geological formation in Australia

- Stratigraphic range: Early Cretaceous (Albian); ~104–102 Ma
- Type: Geological formation
- Unit of: Rolling Downs Group
- Underlies: Mackunda Formation, Normanton Formation
- Overlies: Toolebuc Formation

Lithology
- Primary: Mudstone
- Other: Sandstone, siltstone

Location
- Coordinates: 24°52′02.17″S 146°14′19.85″E
- Approximate paleocoordinates: 51.0°S 133.1°E
- Region: Queensland
- Country: Australia
- Extent: Eromanga Basin
- Allaru Formation (Australia) Allaru Formation (Queensland)

The Allaru Formation, also known as the Allaru Mudstone, and formerly known as the Allaru Member of the Wilgunya Formation, is a geological formation in Queensland, Australia, whose strata date back to the Early Cretaceous. Dinosaur remains are among the fossils that have been recovered from the formation, alongside those of the protostegid turtle Notochelone, the ichthyosaur Platypterygius, fishes, cephalopods, the crab Torynomma and the coral Mckenziephyllia.

== Geology ==
The Allaru Formation, a sedimentary unit, spans across the Eromanga and Carpentaria basins. It overlies the Toolebuc Formation conformably, and in turn underlies the Mackunda Formation in the Eromanga Basin, and within the Carpentaria Basin by the Normanton Formation. Alongside the Mackunda Formation in which it is overlain by, the Allaru Formation records the gradual inundation of the Eromanga Basin.

The formation consists of blue-grey mudstones, but also very fine sandstones and minute, tough interbeds of thin calcareous siltstone. which originated from volcanoes to the east. Its rocks host a variety of invertebrate macrofossils, which include ammonites, bivalves, crustaceans, and belemnites. Located near Brutus Creek on Currane Station, lying north of Dartmouth, Queensland, is one particular site that has been suggested to be an exposure of the central layers of the Allaru Formation. This site has also produced concretions in which invertebrate fossils are common, mainly hosting ammonites, belemnites and crustaceans.

== Paleobiota ==
Color key: Taxon / Reclassified taxon / Taxon falsely reported as present / Dubious taxon or junior synonym / Ichnotaxon / Ootaxon / Morphotaxon

Notes
Uncertain or tentative taxa are in small text
~~crossed out~~ taxa are discredited.

=== Dinosaurs ===
Dinosaurs of the Allaru Formation
Genus	Species	Clade	Image
Austrosaurus	A. mckillopi	A somphospondylan sauropod	Reconstruction of A. mckillopi.
Kunbarrasaurus	K. ieversi	Ankylosauria, Parankylosauria	Model of Minmi paravertebra, based on K. ieversi.
Muttaburrasaurus	?M. sp.	Ornithopoda, Elasmaria? incertae sedis	Reconstruction of Muttaburrasaurus.

=== Other reptiles ===
Other reptiles of the Allaru Formation
Genus	Species	Clade	Image
Elasmosauridae indet.	sp. indet.	Plesiosauria, Elasmosauridae	
Notochelone	N. costata	Testudines, Protostegidae	Reconstruction of N. costata.
Platypterygius	P. australis (=longmani)	Ichthyosauria, Ophthalmosauridae	Life restoration of Platypterygius.

=== Fishes ===
Fishes of the Allaru Formation
Genus	Species	Clade	Image
Cooyoo	C. australis	Ichthyodectiformes, Ichthyodectidae	Restoration of C. australis.
Flindersichthys	F. denmeadi	Elopiformes, incertae sedis	
Pachyrhizodus	P. marathonensis	Crossognathiformes Pachyrhizodontidae	Restoration of the related P. caninus.
Pachyrhizodus	P. grawi	Crossognathiformes Pachyrhizodontidae	Restoration of the related P. caninus.
Richmondichthys	R. sweeti	Aspidorhynchiformes, Aspidorhynchidae	Sketch of R. sweeti holotype.

=== Invertebrates ===
Invertebrates of the Allaru Formation
Genus	Species	Notes	Image
Aucellina	A. sp.	Pectinida, Buchiidae	
Beudanticeras	B. sp.	Ammonitida, Desmoceratidae	
Eromangateuthis	E. soniae	Octopodiformes, Plesioteuthididae	
Goodhallites	G. goodhalli	Ammonitida, Brancoceratidae	
Inoceramus	I. sutherlandi	Pteriida, Inoceramidae	Fossil of the related Inoceramus cycloides.
Labeceras	L. sp.	Ancyloceratina, Labeceratidae	Reconstruction of various ammonites (Labeceras in upper left).
Mckenziephyllia	M. accordensis	Scleractinia, Mussidae	
Myloceras	M. sp.	Ancyloceratina, Labeceratidae	
Torynomma	T. quadrata	Decapoda, Torynommidae	

== See also ==
- List of dinosaur-bearing rock formations
- Winton Formation, a younger member of the same Rolling Downs Group
- Paja Formation, contemporaneous Lagerstätte in Colombia
- Sierra Madre Formation, contemporaneous fossiliferous formation of Mexico
- Santana Group, contemporaneous Lagerstätte in northeastern Brazil
  - Crato Formation
  - Romualdo Formation
- South Polar region of the Cretaceous
