= Rolling Downs Group =

Stratigraphic layer in Australia

- Stratigraphic range: Mid Barremian-Early Turonian; ~127–90 Ma
- Type: Group
- Sub-units: Griman Creek Formation; Manuka Subgroup; Winton Formation; Mackunda Formation; Wilgunya Subgroup; Allaru Formation; Toolebuc Formation; Wallumbilla Formation; Marree Subgroup; Bellinger Sandstone; Bulldog Shale; Coorikiana Sandstone; Oodnadatta Formation
- Underlies: Quaternary Lake Eyre Basin sediments
- Overlies: Cadna-Owie Formation, Bungil Formation
- Thickness: up to 1,200 m (3,900 ft)

Lithology
- Primary: Mudstone, siltstone, sandstone
- Other: Limestone, claystone

Location
- Coordinates: 22.6°S 143.0°E
- Region: New South Wales; Queensland; South Australia
- Country: Australia
- Extent: Eromanga & Surat Basins

The Rolling Downs Group is a stratigraphic group present in the Eromanga and Surat Basins in eastern Australia, which was deposited between the mid Barremian to early Turonian of the Cretaceous period. It primarily consists of nearshore shallow marine sediments deposited in the Eromanga Sea, though the uppermost and terminal members, the Winton Formation and the Griman Creek Formation represents freshwater deposits. It is notable for its fossil content including many dinosaurs and mammals, as well as opal. A relict species of dicynodont was suggested to have been found in these rocks, but is more likely to be misidentified pieces of a Cenozoic marsupial from younger sediments.
