= Alan Bartholomai =

Australian geologist and palaeontologist

Alan Bartholomai AM (1938–2015) was a geologist and palaeontologist, and Director of the Queensland Museum from 1969 to 1999.

== Early life and education ==
Alan Bartholomai was born on 31 December 1938 in Boonah, Queensland. He attended Boonah State School and after his parents moved the family to the Gold Coast, he attended the Southport State School. He boarded at Gatton College in 1953–1954 where he took his Junior Certificate, and completed his senior studies at Southport State High School. He was able to obtain a Commonwealth Scholarship to attend the University of Queensland and pursue a BSc in geology and zoology, graduating in 1960.

== Career ==
After graduation, Bartholomai was appointed the Curator of Geology at the Queensland Museum. He studied his MSc on fossil kangaroos, under the supervision of Dorothy Hill, and graduated in 1969. He continued his study toward a PhD, taking this in 1973 with a thesis on the Stratigraphy, skeletal morphology and evolution of the Upper Cainozoic and recent Macropodidae of Queensland. He became Director of the Queensland Museum in 1969 and continued in this role until 1999. Despite the difficulties of balancing this job with research, he maintained a steady interest in Cretaceous fish faunas of the Great Artesian Basin and published eleven papers on this topic.

The Queensland Museum expanded under his direction; staff employed there increased from 44 to 200. He sought to employ professional staff with science and curatorial backgrounds and help the Museum build visitor numbers by revitalising displays. The Museum purchased life sized models of Triceratops horridus in 1976 and Tyrannosaurs rex in 1978, at his recommendation. The Museum was also moved to the South Bank Cultural Centre Precinct in 1985, as it had outgrown its previous location in Fortitude Valley near the Brisbane Exhibition show grounds.

Further extensions to the Queensland Museum network occurred during Bartholomai's time as Director, including the establishment of the Museum of Lands, Mapping and Surveying at Woolloongabba, Woodworks in Gympie, the Cobb & Co Museum in Toowoomba, the Museum of Tropical Queensland in Townsville, the Museum of North West Queensland in Mt Isa and the Science Centre in Brisbane.

He was an Honorary Research Fellow with James Cook University. He served on a number of committees at both state and national level. He was a member of the World Wildlife Fund for Nature, the Lizard Island Research Committee (Australian Museum) and a past President of the Royal Society of Queensland.

Bartholomai participated in the American Museum of Natural History expedition in 1971. He also undertook palaeontological work at Rewan in central Queensland. He joined the Natural History Museum (British) expedition to collect Queensland Mesozoic vertebrates in 1978. He had studied the Riversleigh site in Queensland in 1965, before it would become a major fossil site in 1975. He facilitated the acquisition of the Muttaburrasaurus and Minmi dinosaur specimens.

Other collections which Bartholomai pursued for the Museum included a collection of personal memorabilia of Sir Charles Kingsford Smith.

Bartholomai established exchange relationships for the Museum with Saitama Prefectural Museum of Japan in 1989. He was a part of the Australian delegation to the 1998 United Nations Environment Program Convention on Biological Diversity, which aimed to stress the vital role of exchange in assisting the taxonomy of biological collections. He was also an advocate for the return of 3,297 items of the Sir William Macgregor Collection of Papua New Guinea Artefacts to PNG from 1979 to 1999.

== Honours ==
· 2012 - Member of the Order of Australia for his service to the advancement of science, particularly through administrative roles with the Queensland Museum.

== Fossils named for him ==
- Didymalgia bartholomai Cook, 1997 (Fossil Gastropod)
- Megateg bartholomai Raven & Stumkat, 2005 (Spider)
- Hypsiprymnodon bartholomaii Flannery & Archer, 1987 (Fossil Marsupial)

== Fossil taxa identified by him ==
- Thylacoleo crassidentatus Bartholamai, 1962
- Sthenurus antiquus Bartholomai, 1963
- Sthenurus notabilis Bartholomai, 1963
- Troposodon Bartholomai, 1967
- Protemnodon chinchillaensis Bartholomai, 1973
- Protemnodon devisi Bartholomai, 1973
- Fissuridon pearsoni Bartholomai, 1973
- Macropus rama Bartholomai, 1975
- Macropus woodsi Bartholomai, 1975
- Macropus piltonensis Bartholomai, 1975
- Troposodon Bartholomai, 1978
- Troposodon bluffensis Bartholomai, 1978
- Protemnodon snewini Bartholomai, 1978
- Macropus (Osphranter) pavana Bartholomai, 1978
- Phascolarctos stirtoni Bartholomai, 1968
- Dasyurus dunmalli Bartholomai, 1971
- Kadimakara Bartholamai, 1979
- Kadimakara australiensis Bartholamai, 1979
- Kudnu Bartholomai, 1979
- Kudnu mackinlayi Bartholomai, 1979
- Muttaburrasaurus Bartholomai & Molnar, 1981
- Muttaburrasaurus langdoni Bartholomai & Molnar, 1981
- Cooyoo australis Lees & Bartholomai, 1987
- Richmondichthys Bartholomai, 2004
- Ptykoptychion wadeae Bartholomai, 2008
- Euroka Bartholomai, 2010
- Euroka dunravenensis Bartholomai, 2010
- Eurokidae Bartholomai, 2010
- Pachyrhizodus grawi Bartholomai, 2012
- Marathonichthys Bartholomai, 2013
- Marathonichthys coyleorum Bartholomai, 2013
- Stewartichthys Bartholomai, 2013
- Stewartichthys leichhardti Bartholomai, 2013
- Canaryichthys Bartholomai, 2015
- Canaryichthys rozefeldsi Bartholomai, 2015

== Personal life ==
Bartholomai married Patricia Sheehy and they had three children, Dean, Kim and Leigh. He died on 17 December 2015.
