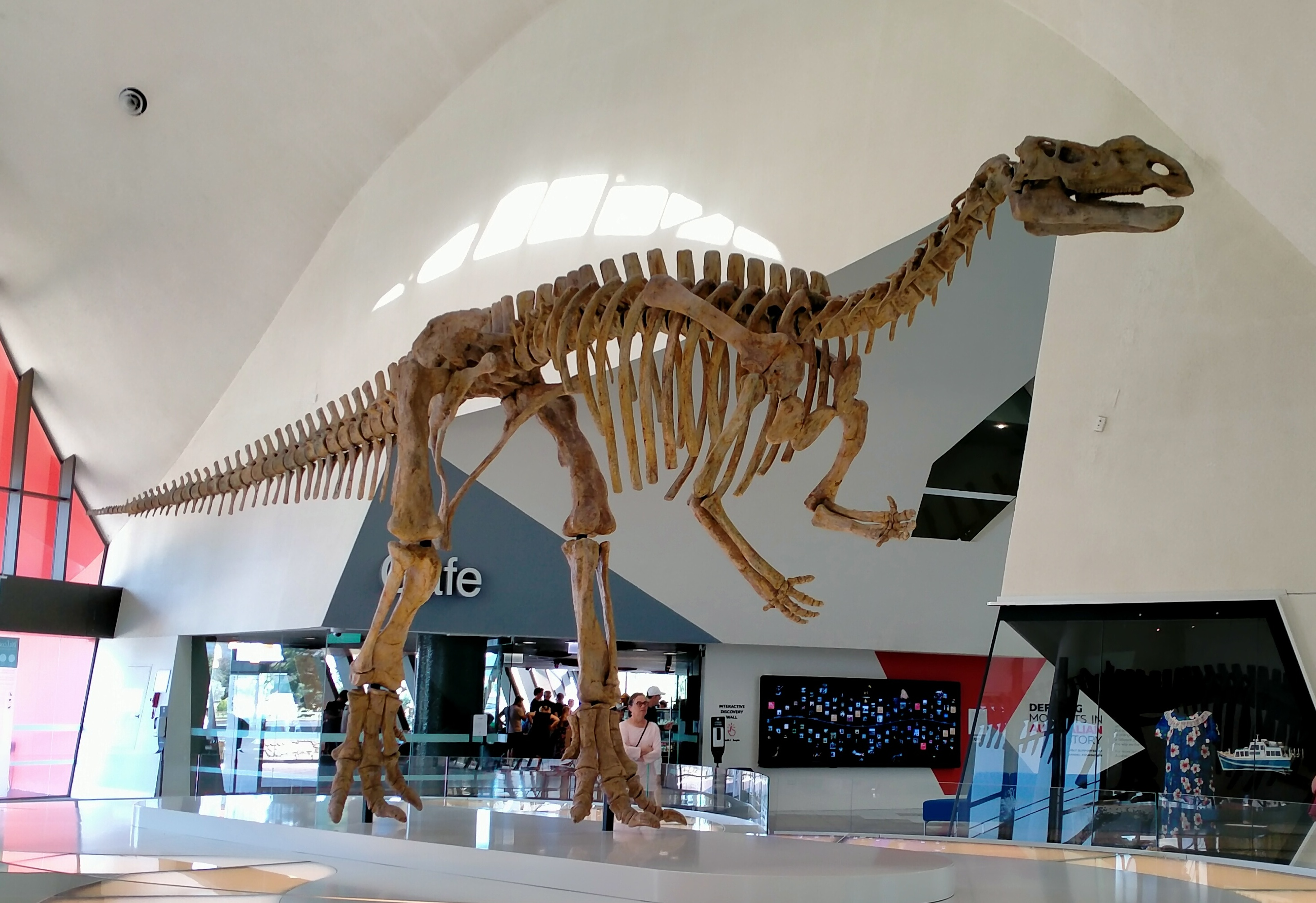
- Mounted skeleton, National Museum of Australia

Scientific classification
- Kingdom: Animalia
- Phylum: Chordata
- Class: Reptilia
- Clade: Dinosauria
- Clade: †Ornithischia
- Clade: †Ornithopoda
- Genus: †Muttaburrasaurus; Bartholomai & Molnar, 1981
- Species: †M. langdoni

Binomial name
- †Muttaburrasaurus langdoni Bartholomai & Molnar, 1981

= Muttaburrasaurus =

Muttaburrasaurus Temporal range: Early-Late Cretaceous, Albian–Cenomanian

Extinct genus of dinosaur from Queensland

Muttaburrasaurus is a genus of herbivorous ornithopod dinosaur that lived in what is now north-eastern Australia during the Albian-Cenomanian stages of the Cretaceous period. It has been recovered in some analyses as a member of the iguanodontian clade Rhabdodontomorpha, but more recent research has suggested a more basal position in the ornithopod family tree, potentially as a member of Elasmaria. After Kunbarrasaurus, it is Australia's most completely known dinosaur from skeletal remains. It was named after Muttaburra, the site in Queensland, Australia, where it was found. The dinosaur was selected from twelve candidates to become the official fossil emblem of the State of Queensland.

== Discovery ==
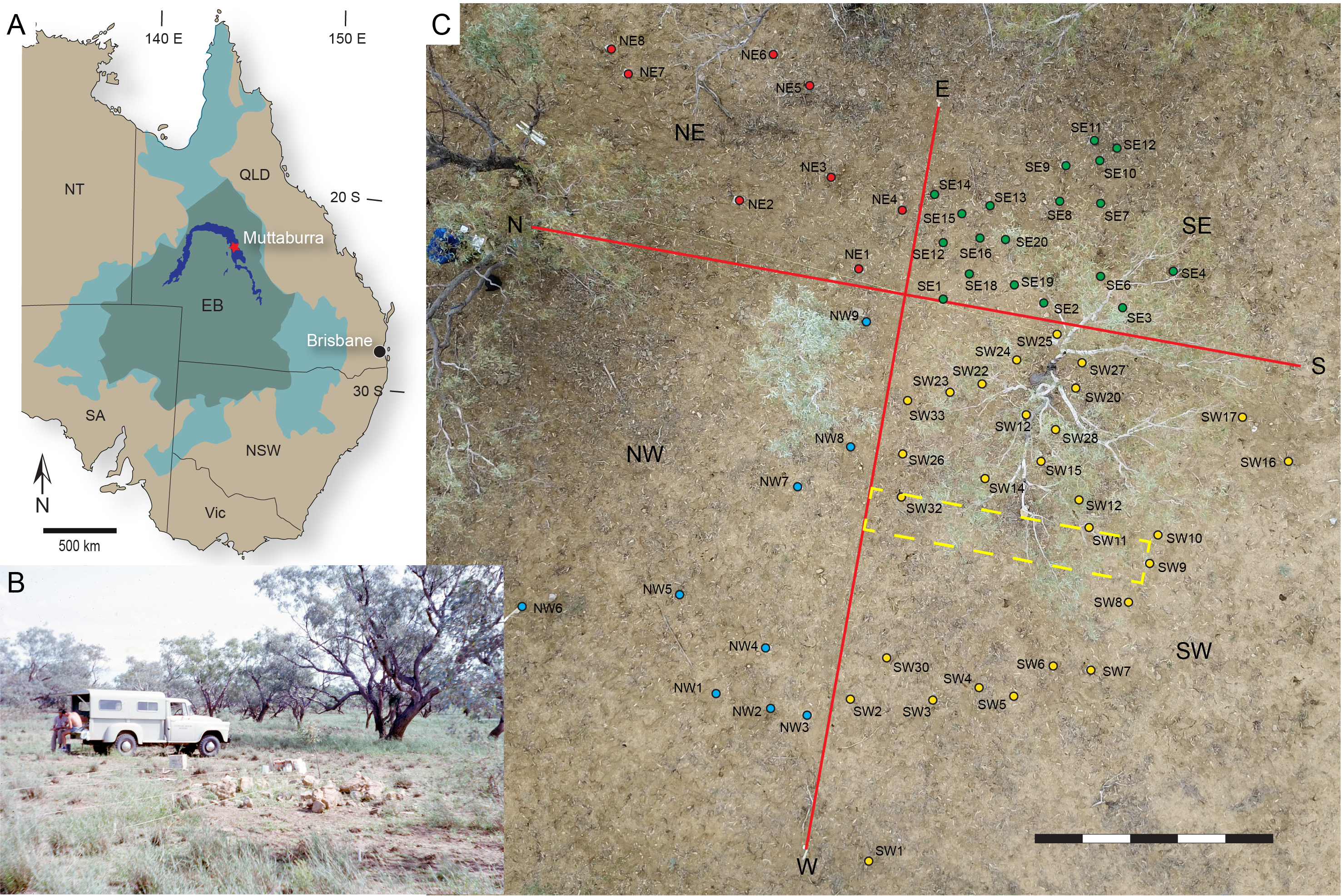
Maps and photos of the holotype locality

The species was initially described from a partial skeleton found by grazier Doug Langdon in 1963 at Rosebery Downs Station beside Thomson River near Muttaburra, in the Australian state of Queensland, which also provides the creature's generic name. The remains were collected by paleontologist Dr Alan Bartholomai and entomologist Edward Dahms. After a lengthy preparation of the fossils, it was named in 1981 by Bartholomai and Ralph Molnar, who honoured its discoverer with its specific name, langdoni.

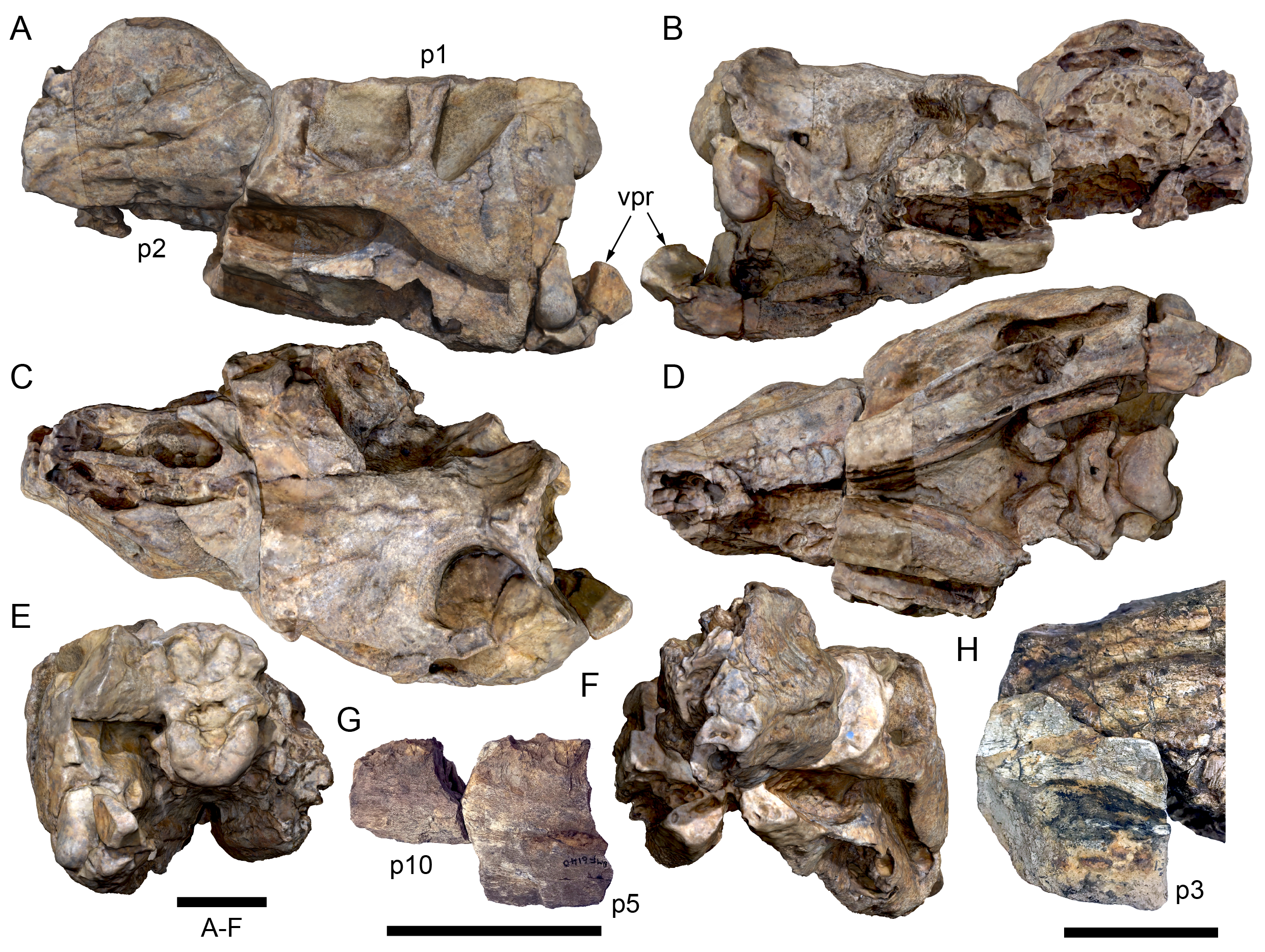
Holotype skull in multiple views

The holotype, specimen QM F6140, was found in the Mackunda Formation. The depositional age of the type locality is suggested to be the Cenomanian stage, specifically 96.3 ± 8.6 million years ago, based on U/Pb detrital zircon samples in the vicinity of holotype. It consists of a partial skeleton with skull and lower jaws. The underside of the skull and the back of the mandibula, numerous vertebrae, parts of the pelvis, and parts of the front and hind limbs have been preserved.

Some teeth have been discovered further north, near Hughenden, and south at Lightning Ridge, in north-western New South Wales. At Lightning Ridge, there have been found opalised teeth and a scapula that may be from a Muttaburrasaurus. A skull, known as the "Dunluce Skull", specimen QM F14921, was discovered by John Stewart-Moore and 14-year-old Robert Walker on Dunluce Station, between Hughenden and Richmond in 1987. It originates from somewhat older layers of the Allaru Mudstone (Albian) and was considered by Molnar to be a separate, yet unnamed species, a Muttaburrasaurus sp. The same area produced two fragmentary skeletons in 1989. There have also been isolated teeth and bones found at Iona Station, south-east of Hughenden.

Reconstructed skeleton casts of Muttaburrasaurus, sponsored by Kellogg Company, have been put on display at a number of museums, including the Queensland Museum, Flinders Discovery Centre, and the Australian Museum.

== Description ==
Scale comparison with human

Muttaburrasaurus was about 8 metres (26 ft), with initial body mass estimates of around 2.8 metric tons (3.1 short tons). More recent research suggests much greater mass estimates for the taxa. Bishop et al. in 2020 used volumetric modeling to suggest a body mass of around 7,916 kg, while a 2026 study by Herne et al. calculated a body mass of around 8,854 kg using stylopodial equations. This would make Muttaburrasaurus comparable in size to some of the larger specimens of T. rex and bull African bush elephants, making it by far the largest ornithischian to retain premaxillary teeth. The femur of the holotype has a length of 1,015 millimetres (40.0 in).

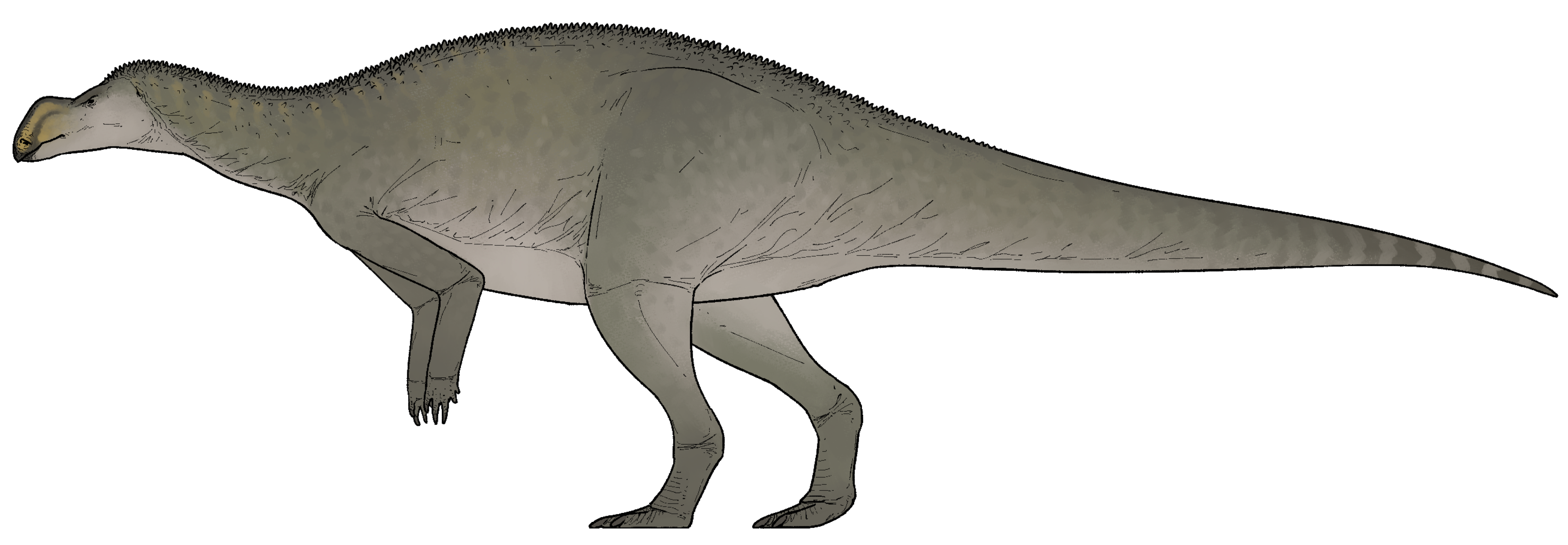
Life reconstruction

Originally reconstructing Muttaburrasaurus with a thumb spike, Molnar later doubted such a structure was present. The foot was long and broad, with four toes. Whether Muttaburrasaurus is capable of quadrupedal movement has been debated; was originally thought to be an "iguanodontid", though recent studies indicate a rhabdodont position which generally adopted a bipedal posture. While its relation to rhabdodonts is severely questionable now, further anatomical evidence suggests bipedal locomotion was preferable in Muttaburrasaurus, possessing short forelimbs and a semicircular canal shape more in line with the inners ears of other facultative bipedal ornithopods such as basal hadrosauroids. Quadrupedal locomotion would appear to be reserved for when the animal was moving slowly or when stationary and browsing on foliage.

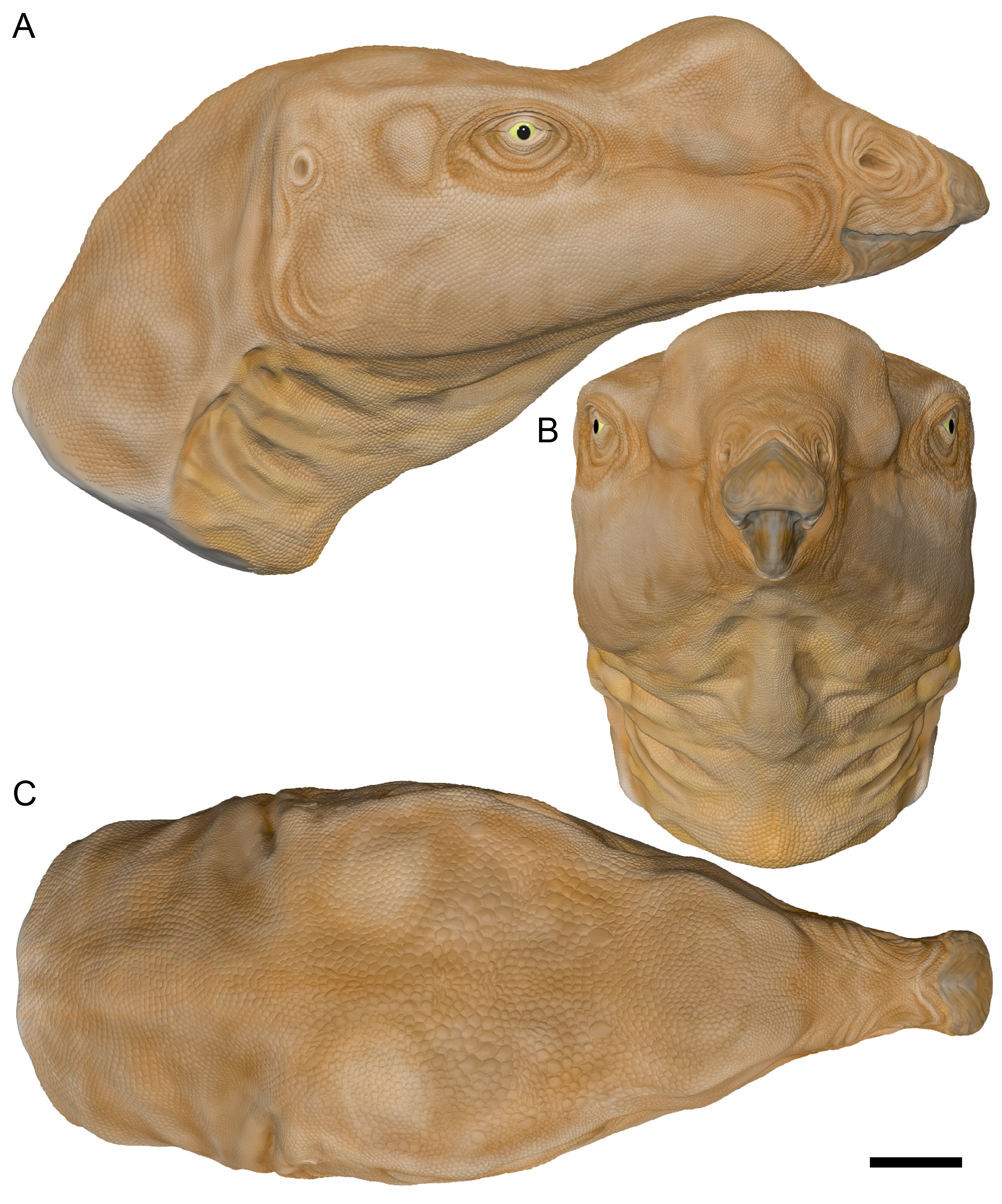
Reconstruction of the head

The skull of Muttaburrasaurus was rather long, with a triangular cross-section when seen from above. The snout includes a strongly enlarged, hollow bulge originally considered to have been a resonating chamber to produce that might distinctive calls or a visual display features. However, later research concluded the bulge was part of a greatly elongated premaxilla, unlikely to have played a role as a resonating chamber. Muttaburrasaurus is unique amongst ornithischians of its size class for possessing premaxillary teeth, a feature that is ancestral to all ornithischians and is present in many small or basal species, but are usually lost in nearly all the large or derived members of the group.

== Classification ==
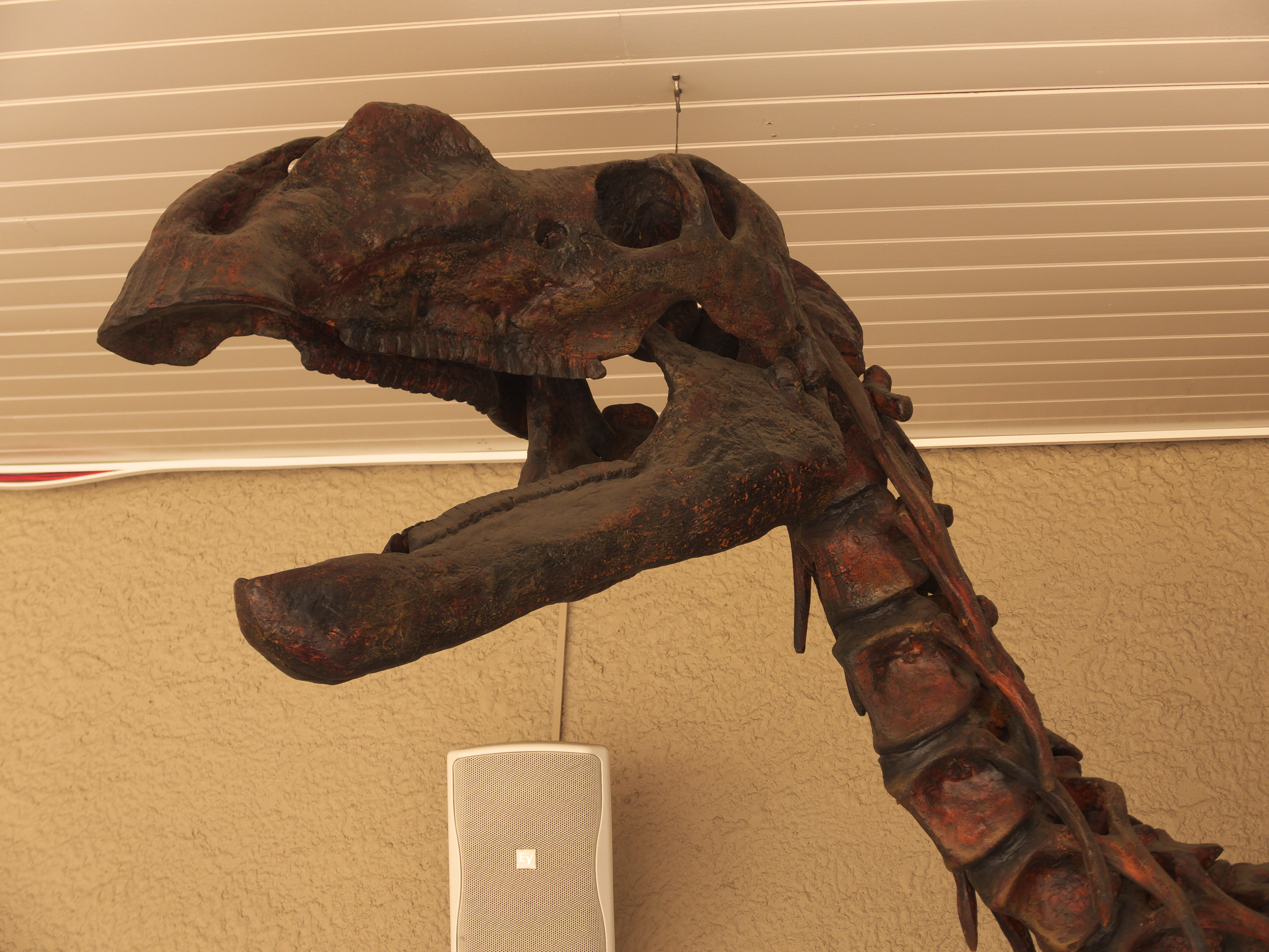
Reconstructed skull showing the outdated nasal bulla and edentulous premaxilla

Molnar originally assigned Muttaburrasaurus to the Iguanodontidae. Later authors suggested more basal euornithopod groups such as the Camptosauridae, Dryosauridae, or Hypsilophodontidae. Studies by Andrew McDonald indicate a position in the Rhabdodontidae. A 2022 phylogenetic analysis recovered Muttaburrasaurus and Tenontosaurus as basal rhabdodontomorphs and found them to likely represent sister taxa to Rhabdodontidae.

The following cladogram was recovered by Dieudonné and colleagues in 2016:

- Iguanodontia
  - - Anabisetia
    - - Tenontosaurus
      - Dryomorpha
  - Rhabdodontomorpha
    - Muttaburrasaurus
    - - Foskeia ('Vegagete ornithopod')
      - Rhabdodontidae
        - Mochlodon
        - - Rhabdodon
          - Zalmoxes

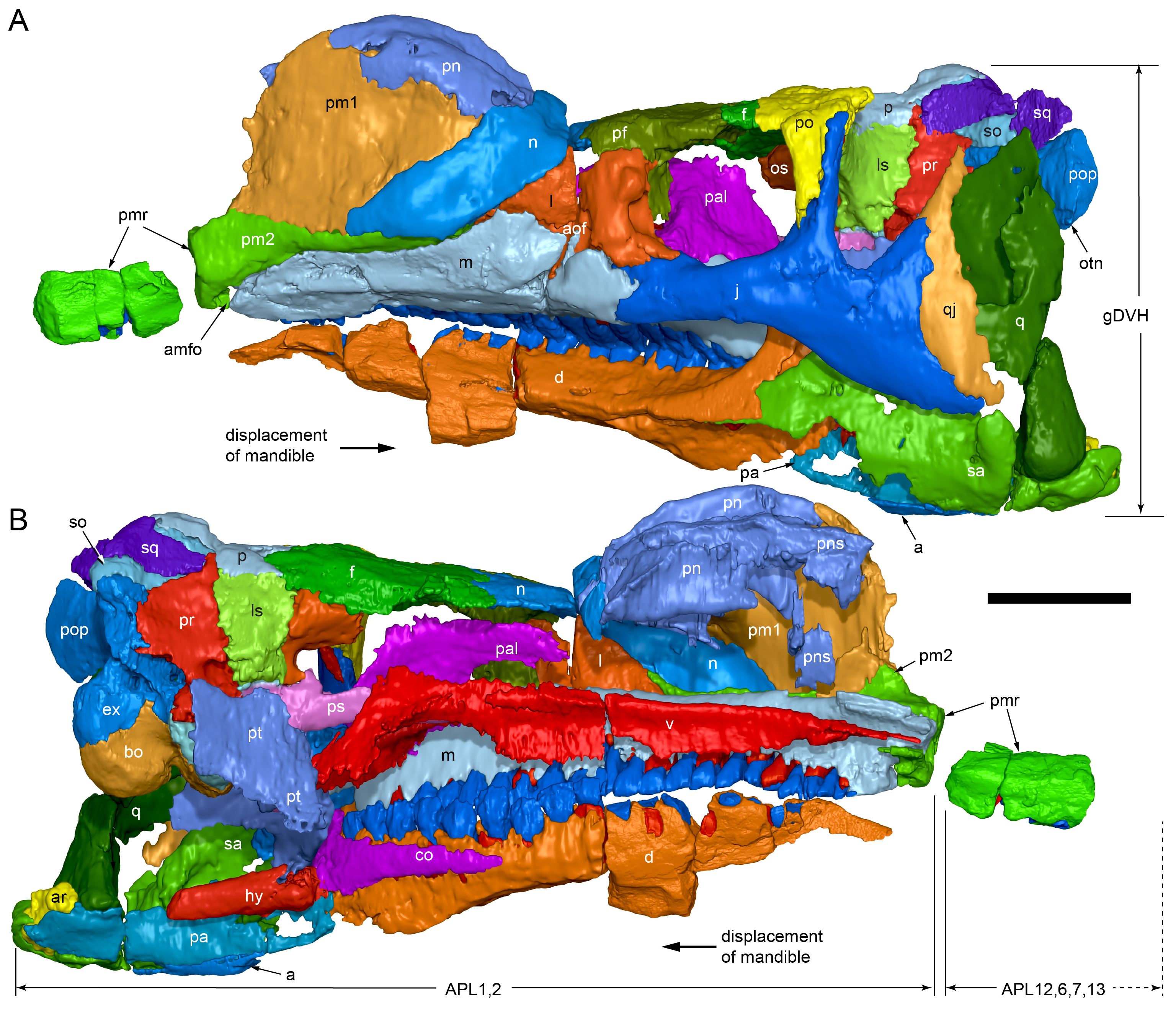
3D model of the holotype skull

However, in 2024, Fonseca and colleagues considered Muttaburrasaurus to be outside Rhabdodontomorpha and instead classified it as a member of the Gondwanan clade Elasmaria, alongside Fostoria dhimbangunmal. In their 2026 redescription of the Muttaburrasaurus skull, Herne and colleagues comment that several cranial features, including the retention of premaxillary teeth, mean the taxa is likely not a rhabdodontomorph and may even fall outside of the greater Iguanodontia clade.

The cladogram below was recovered by Fonseca et al., 2024.

- Ornithopoda
  - Hypsilophodontidae
    - Gideonmantellia amosanjuanae
    - Hypsilophodon foxii
  - Iguanodontia
    - Rhabdodontomorpha
    - Euiguanodontia
      - Callovosaurus leedsi
      - Dryomorpha
        - Dryosauridae
          - - Elrhazosaurus nigeriensis
            - Valdosaurus canaliculatus
          - - Eousdryosaurus nanohallucis
            - - Dysalotosaurus lettowvorbecki
              - - Dryosaurus altus
                - Dryosaurus elderae
        - - CM 1949
          - - - Draconyx loureiroi
              - Oblitosaurus bunnueli
            - - Camptosauridae
                - Camptosaurus dispar
                - Uteodon aphanoecetes
              - Styracosterna
                - Cumnoria prestwichii
                - - Owenodon hoggii
                  - - Hippodraco scutodens
                    - - Ouranosaurus nigeriensis
                      - - Iguanodon bernissartensis
                        - Hadrosauroidea
      - Elasmaria
        - Iyuku raathi
        - - Weewarrasaurus pobeni
          - - Kangnasaurus coetzeei
            - - - Anabisetia saldiviai
                - Diluvicursor pickeringi
              - - - Notohypsilophodon comodorensis
                  - - Trinisaura santamartaensis
                    - Gasparinisaura cincosaltensis
                - - Galleonosaurus dorisae
                  - Mahuidacursor lipanglef
                  - Morrosaurus antarcticus
                  - Atlascopcosaurus loadsi
                  - Qantassaurus intrepidus
                  - Fostoria dhimbangunmal
                  - Isasicursor santacrucensis
                  - Muttaburrasaurus langdoni
                  - Talenkauen santacrucensis
                  - Sektensaurus sanjuanboscoi
                  - Leaellynasaura amicagraphica
                  - Macrogryphosaurus gondwanicus

== Palaeobiology ==
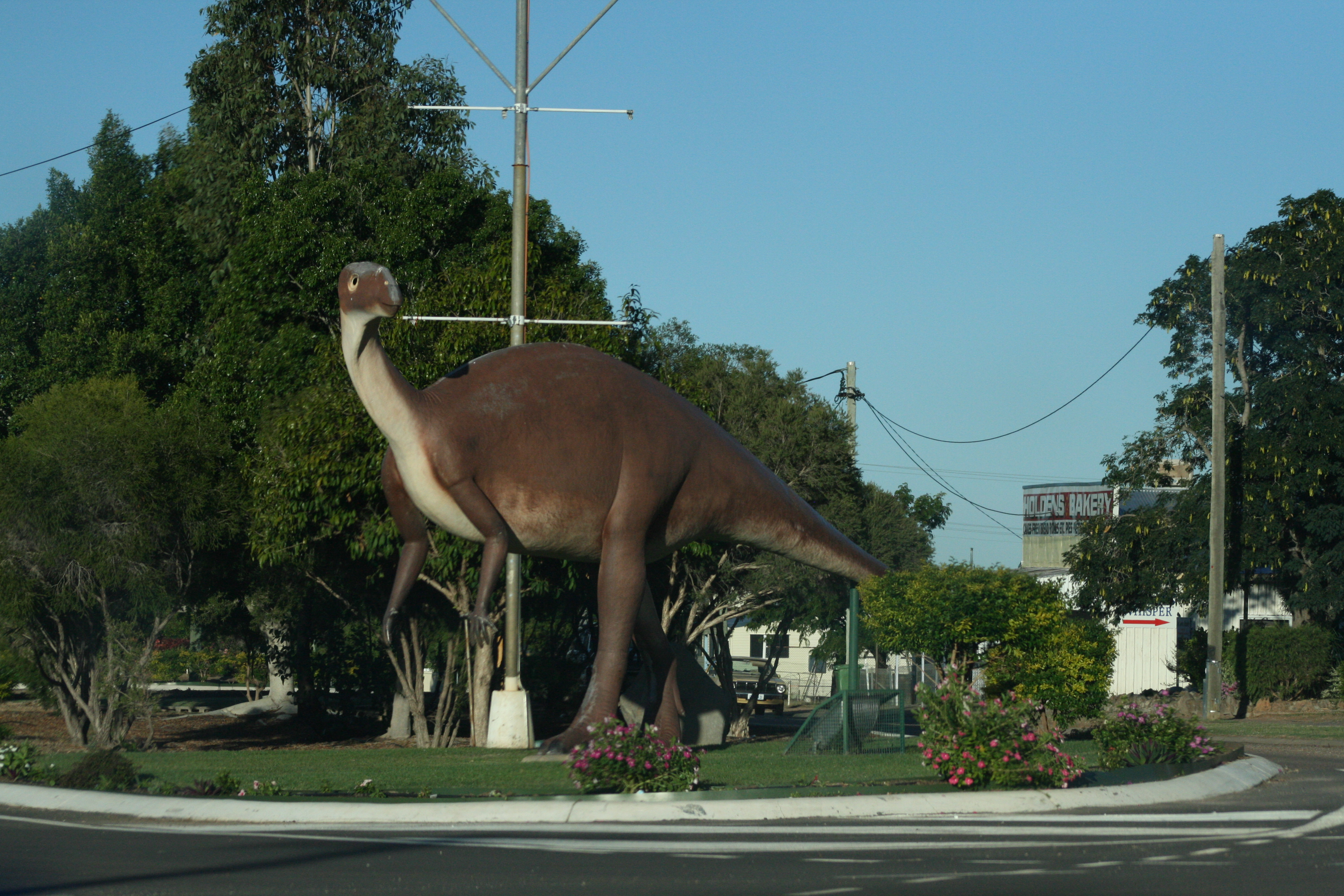
Statue in Hughenden, Queensland, Australia

Muttaburrasaurus had very powerful jaws equipped with shearing teeth. Whereas in more derived ornithopod species, the replacement teeth alternated with the previous tooth generation to form a tooth battery, in Muttaburrasaurus, they grew directly under them, and only a single erupted generation was present, thus precluding a chewing motion. An additional basal trait was the lack of a primary ridge on the teeth sides, which show eleven lower ridges. In 1981, Molnar speculated that these qualities indicated an omnivorous diet, implying that Muttaburrasaurus occasionally ate carrion. In 1995, he changed his opinion, suspecting that Muttaburrasaurus's dental system is evolutionarily convergent with the ceratopsian system of shearing teeth. They would have been an adaptation for eating tough vegetation such as cycads. Reanalysis of the holotype skull published in 2026 suggests that Muttaburrasaurus was a selective feeder due to its narrow snout and possessed a strong sense of smell. Additionally, it was proposed in this same study that Muttaburrasaurus may have possessed nasal salt glands, suggesting it fed on plant material that led to excess salt ingestion, such as plants growing in marine influx and tidal zones, such as salt marshes or tidal swamps or potencially in near shore marine environments such as aquatic plant or algae beds.
