= Impletosphaeridium elegans =

Scientific classification
- Domain: Eukaryota
- (unranked): SAR
- (unranked): Alveolata
- Phylum: Dinoflagellata
- Class: Dinophyceae
- Order: Gonyaulacales
- Family: incertae sedis
- Genus: Impletosphaeridium
- Species: I. elegans

Binomial name
- Impletosphaeridium elegans (He Chengquan, Zhu Shenzhao and Jin Guangxing in He Chengquan et al., 1989) Williams et al., 1998

Synonyms
- Cleistosphaeridium elegans He Chengquan 1991; Cleistosphaeridium elegans He Chengquan, Zhu Shenzhao and Jin Guangxing in He Chengquan et al. 1989

Species of single-celled organism

Impletosphaeridium elegans is an extinct species of dinoflagellate in the order Gonyaulacales. It is from the Early Tertiary.
