= Mackunda Formation =

Geological formation in Queensland, Australia

- Stratigraphic range: Early Cretaceous (Albian) 113.2–100.5 Ma
- Type: Geological formation
- Unit of: Rolling Downs Group
- Underlies: Winton Formation
- Overlies: Allaru Formation
- Thickness: Between 91.5 m (300 ft) and 240 m (790 ft)

Lithology
- Primary: Sandstone, mudstone
- Other: Siltstone

Location
- Coordinates: 22°44′03″S 142°08′30″E
- Approximate paleocoordinates: 52.9°S 132.0°E
- Region: Queensland
- Country: Australia
- Extent: Eromanga Basin
- Mackunda Formation (Australia) Mackunda Formation (Queensland)

The Mackunda Formation is a geological formation in Queensland, Australia whose strata date back to the Albian stage of the Early Cretaceous. It is named after the Mackunda Creek, located in the Mackunda Sheet area. The type section is around the headwaters of Mackunda Creek, on the grounds of the Gnalta Station.

== Geology and fossils ==
The beds which make up the Mackunda Formation consist of primarily thin-bedded, arenaceous sandstone; and blue-grey argillaceous mudstone sediments, which were deposited in marine and paralic environments. Exposures are more numerous than those of the Allaru Formation, but are rarely thicker than a few feet. The thickness of the Mackunda Formation ranges from 91.5 m (300 ft) in the south-west to 240 m (790 ft) in the northeast, estimated from water-bore logs.

Dinosaur remains, most notably those of Muttaburrasaurus langdoni, are among the fossils that have been recovered from the formation, as well as a pterosaur, ammonites, belemnites, bivalves and sharks.

== Paleobiota ==
Color key: Taxon / Reclassified taxon / Taxon falsely reported as present / Dubious taxon or junior synonym / Ichnotaxon / Ootaxon / Morphotaxon

Notes
Uncertain or tentative taxa are in small text
~~crossed out~~ taxa are discredited.

=== Vertebrates ===
Vertebrates of the Mackunda Formation
Genus	Species	Clade	Image
Muttaburrasaurus	M. langdoni	Ornithopoda, Elasmaria? incertae sedis	Skeleton of Muttaburrasaurus.
Ctenochasmatoidea indet.	sp. indet.	Archaeopterodactyloidea, Ctenochasmatoidea incertae sedis	
Iguanodontidae indet.	sp. indet.	Ornithopoda, Iguanodontidae	
Lamniformes indet.	sp. indet.	Lamniformes, incertae sedis	

=== Ammonites ===
Ammonites of the Mackunda Formation
Genus	Species	Clade	Image
Labeceras	L. sp.	Ancyloceratina, Labeceratidae	Reconstruction of various ammonites (Labeceras in upper left).
Myloceras	M. sp.	Ancyloceratina, Labeceratidae	

=== Bivalves ===
Bivalves of the Mackunda Formation
Genus	Species	Clade	Image
Acesta	A. sp.	Limida, Limidae	
Aucellina	A. sp.	Pectinida, Buchiidae	
Cyrenopsis	C. hudlestoni	Cardiida, Veneroidei incertae sedis	
Inoceramus	I. sp.	Pteriida, Inoceramidae	Fossil of the related Inoceramus cycloides.
Maccoyella	M. rookwoodensis	Pectinida, Oxytomidae	
Panopea	P. sp.	Adapedonta, Hiatellidae	
Pseudavicula	P. papyracea	Pectinida, Oxytomidae	
Tatella	T. sp.	Bivalvia incertae sedis	
Solemyidae indet.	sp. indet.	Solemyida, Solemyidae	

=== Gastropods ===
Gastropods of the Mackunda Formation
Genus	Species	Clade	Image
Anchura	A. cf. wilkinsoni	Littorinimorpha, Aporrhaidae	
Avellana	A. spp.	Uncertain	
Cancellaria	C. terraereginensis	Neogastropoda, Cancellariidae	
Euspira	E. cf. reflecta	Littorinimorpha, Naticidae	

== See also ==
- List of dinosaur-bearing rock formations
