= Queensland Museum =

State museum of Queensland

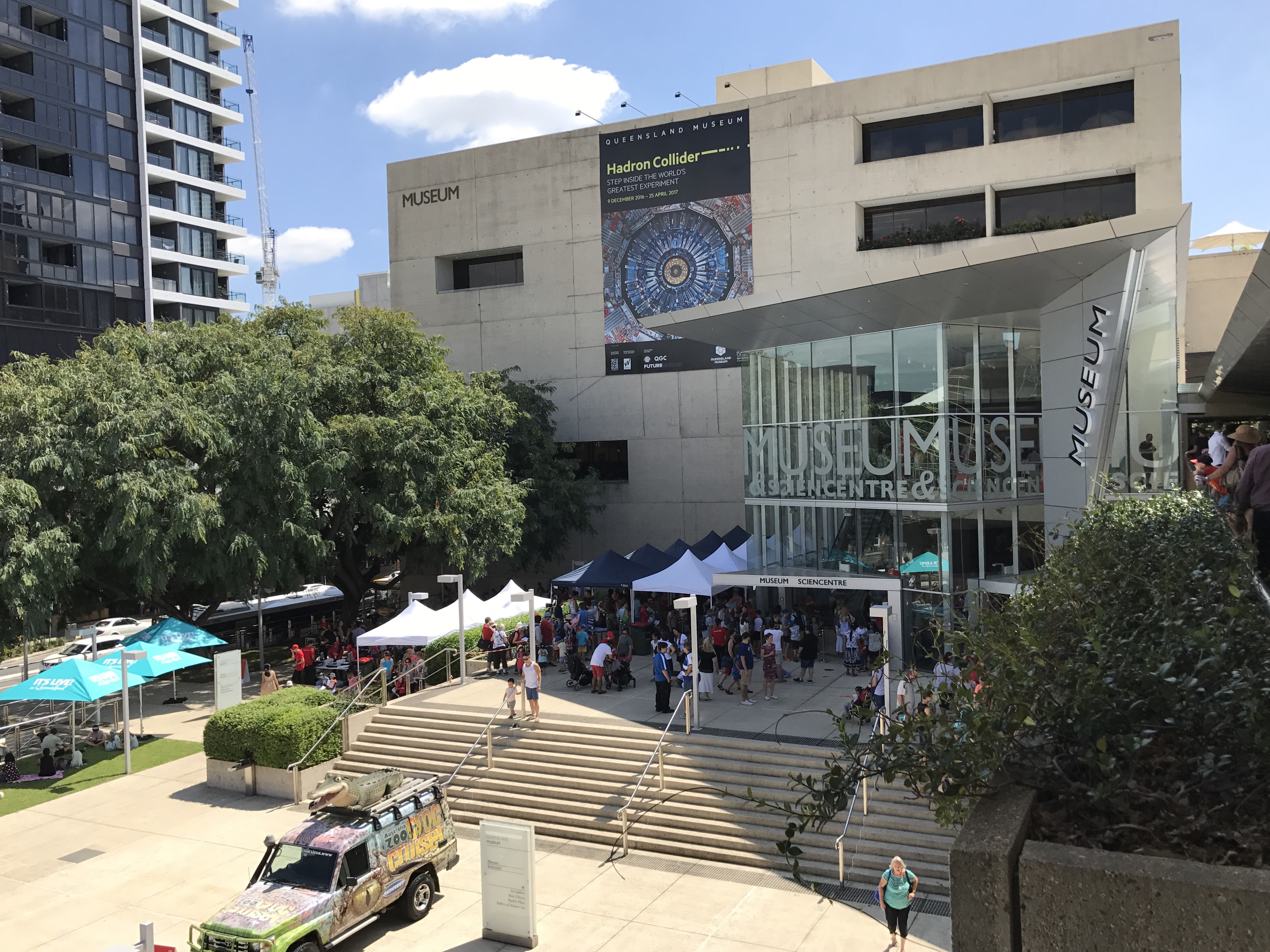
- Queensland Museum at South Brisbane
- Former name: Queensland Museum
- Established: 20 January 1862; 164 years ago
- Location: South Brisbane; North Ipswich; East Toowoomba; Townsville City
- Coordinates: 27°28′24″S 153°01′06″E
- Collection size: 15,200,000+
- Visitors: 2,000,000+ (2019)
- Website: https://www.museum.qld.gov.au

The Queensland Museum is the state museum of Queensland, funded by the Queensland Government, of natural history, cultural heritage, science and human achievement. The museum, operating under the Queensland Museum Act 1970, has custody of over 15.2 million items relating to the State's natural and cultural heritage, including those from the Aboriginal, Torres Strait Islander and Pacific Indigenous cultures.

== History ==
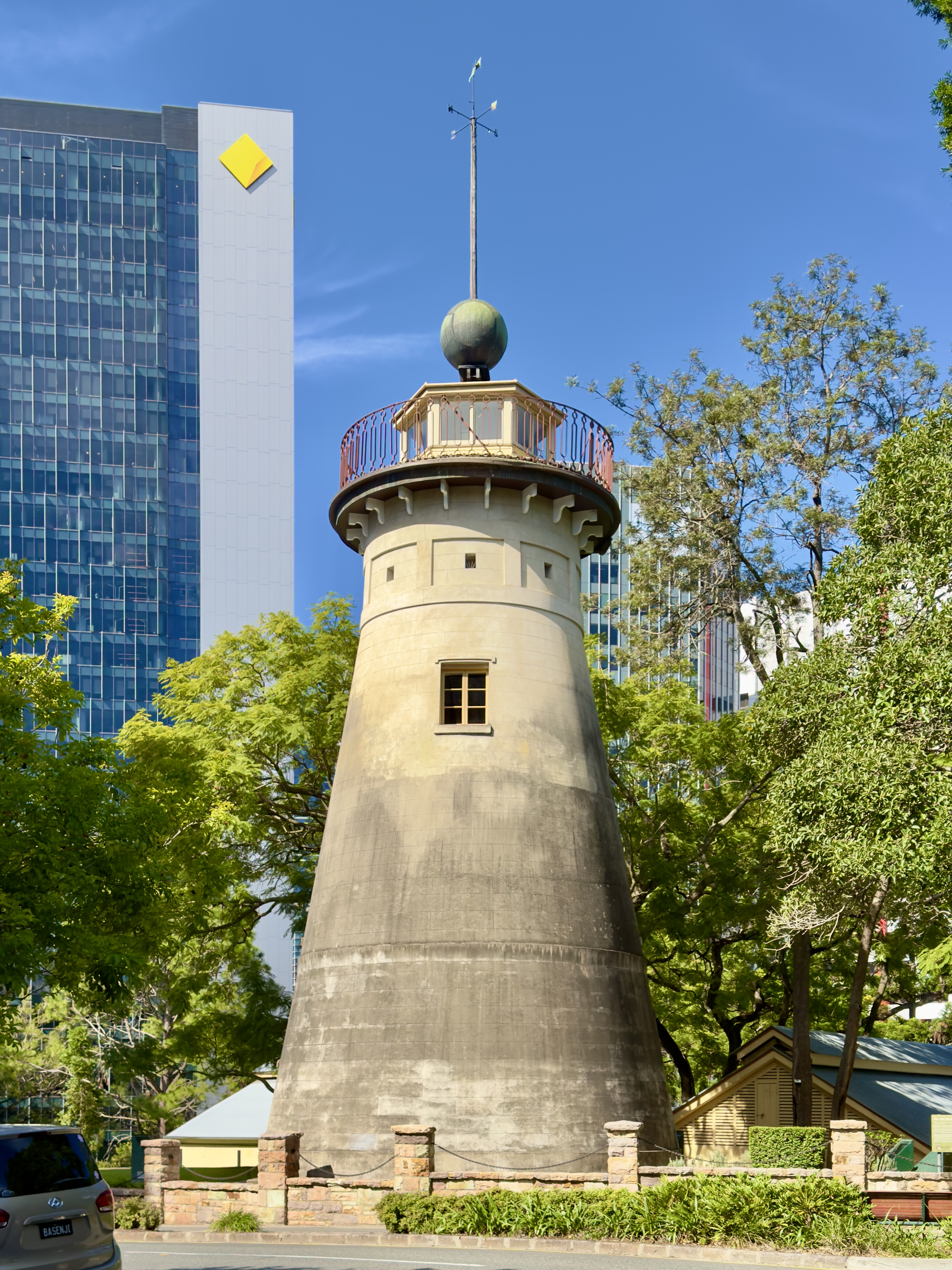
Queensland Museum — 1862–1869 — The Old Windmill in Wickham Terrace (Queensland Museum's first home)

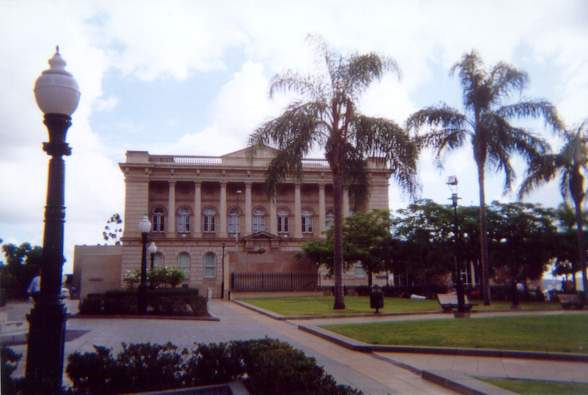
Queensland Museum — 1879–1899 cnr William and Elizabeth Streets, Brisbane — (opposite Queens Gardens)

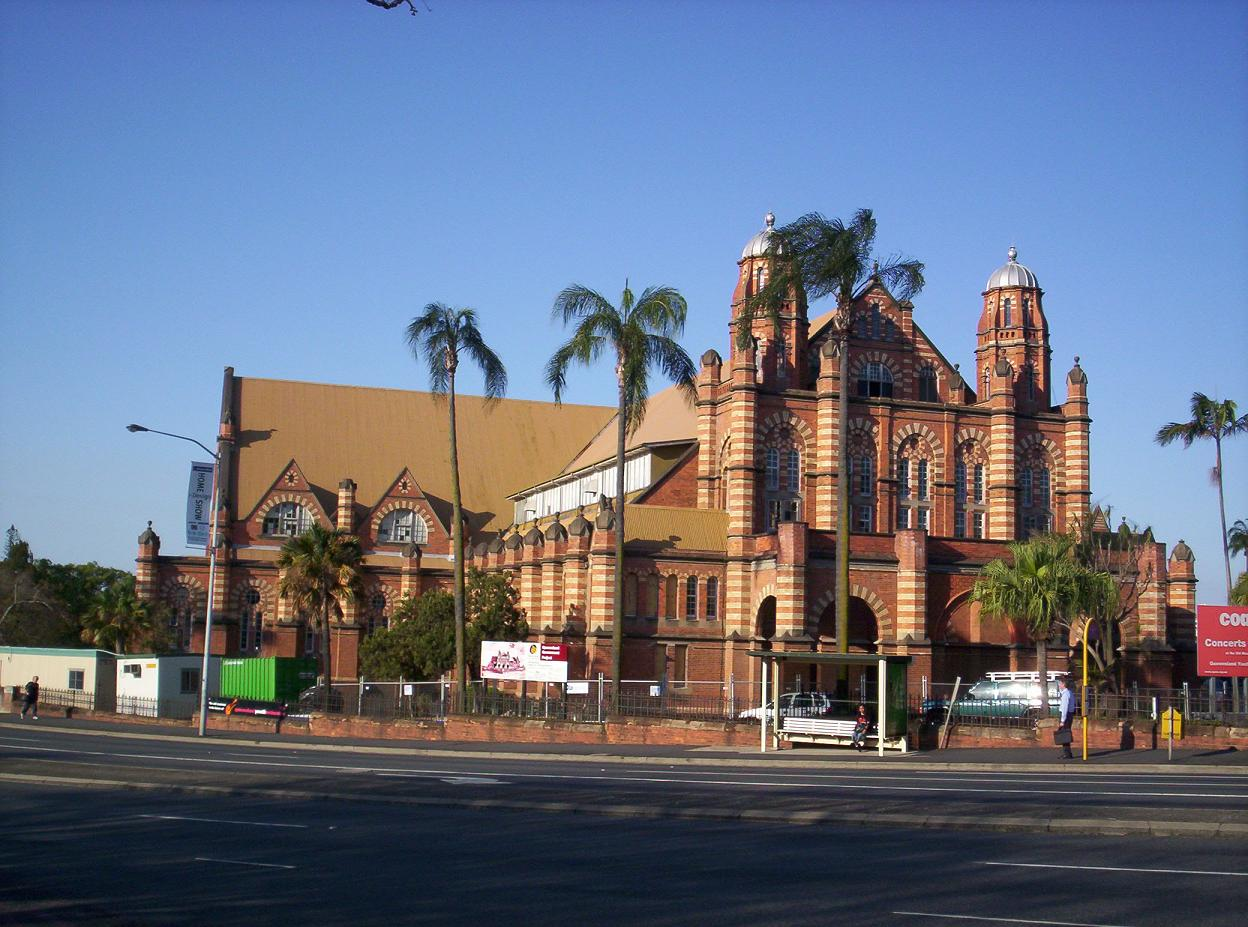
Queensland Museum — 1899–1986 the Old Museum Building in Gregory Terrace, Bowen Hills

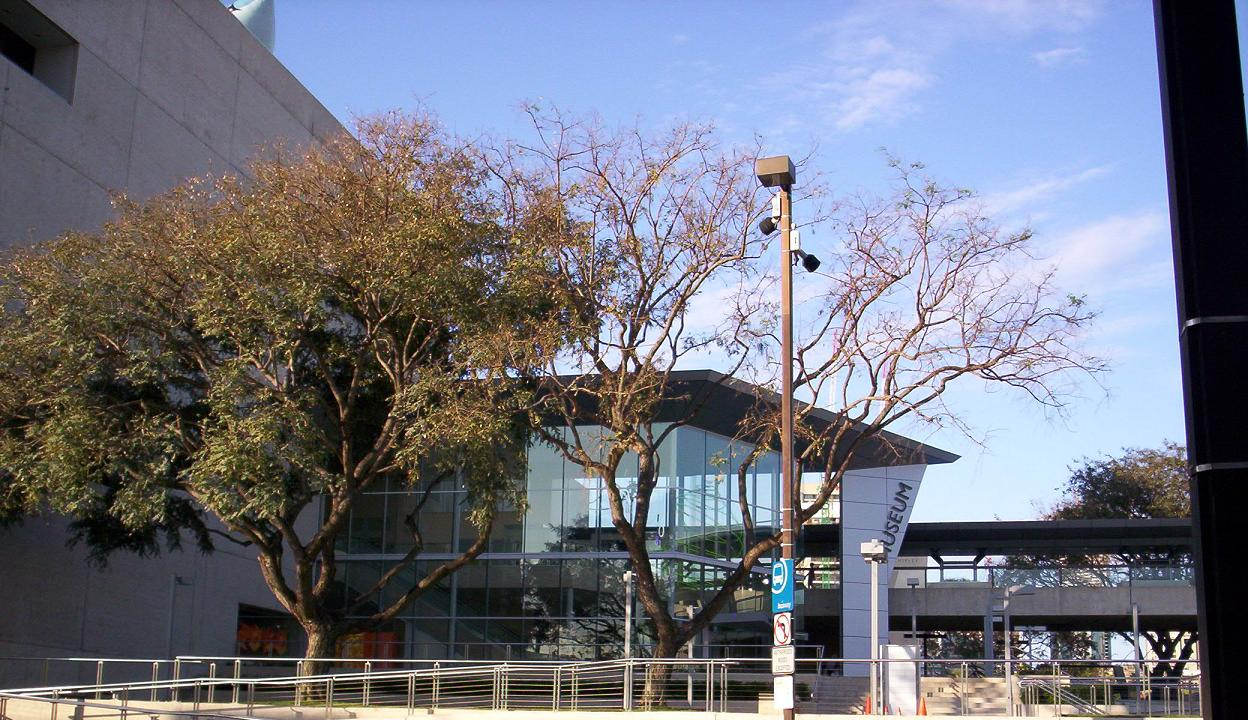
Queensland Museum (1986–present), a part of the Queensland Cultural Centre. A pedestrian bridge, linking the museum and the Queensland Art Gallery to the Queensland Performing Arts Centre, and also to lifts to platforms at the Cultural Centre Busway Station, can be seen on the right.

The Queensland Museum was founded by the Queensland Philosophical Society on 20 January 1862, one of the principal founders being Charles Coxen, and had several temporary homes in Brisbane, Queensland, Australia. The temporary homes included The Old Windmill (1862–1869), Parliament House (1869–1873) and the General Post Office (1873–1879). In 1875 alone, the museum saw over 25,500 visitors over its 310 days open to the zoological, mineralogical, ethnological, mechanical, literary, and artistic exhibitions. At this time, exhibits totalled 6,027.

The government built a home for the museum in William Street, Brisbane City (later called the John Oxley State Library), with the Queensland Museum moving there in 1879. The museum occupied the William Street location for 20 years.

In 1899, the Queensland Museum moved into the Exhibition Hall (now called the Old Museum), Gregory Terrace, Bowen Hills, Brisbane, remaining there for 86 years.

In 1986, the Queensland Museum moved to the Queensland Cultural Centre, South Bank, where the museum is adjacent to the Queensland Art Gallery. Both a tunnel and pedestrian bridge connect the Museum and Art Gallery buildings with the Queensland Performing Arts Centre. Three lifts were added to the bridge in 2004 to provide access to the platforms of the Cultural Centre busway station. A large sculpture of a cicada was located in front of the centre lift, but was removed in 2022 to make way for construction of the Brisbane Metro.

In 1987, the Queensland Museum Medal was created to recognise recipients for major contributions in research and other works. Awardees include palaeontologist Professor Mike Archer, Professor Don Nicklin, palaeontologist Dr Mary Wade, Dr Alan Bartholomai, Steve Irwin, Dr Steve Van Dyck, Anne Jones, Sir David Attenborough, Dr John Hooper, and Professor Peter Andrews.

Curators and directors

- 1872–1879 – Karl Theodor Staiger (died 1888) (first professional curator)
- 1910–1918 – Ronald Hamlyn-Harris (1874–1953) (former science teacher at Toowoomba Grammar School)
- 1918–1945 – Albert Heber Longman (1880–1954)
- 1946–1963 – George Mack (1899–1963), ex-Sydney museum, then senior scientific assistant
- 1964–1969 – Jack Tunstall Woods ISO, former QM geologist
- 1969–c. 1989 – Dr Alan Bartholomai AM (1938–2015).

== Sites ==
The museum operates from its headquarters and general museum in South Brisbane ("Kurilpa") with specialist museums elsewhere in the state.

A separate collections and research centre is based at Hendra.

=== South Brisbane ("Kurilpa") ===
Queensland Museum Kurilpa at South Brisbane is part of the Queensland Cultural Centre complex, alongside the State Library of Queensland, the Queensland Art Gallery, the Gallery of Modern Art and the Queensland Performing Arts Centre. It was opened at this site in 1986, and features several permanent exhibitions:

- Anzac Legacy Gallery, including "Mephisto", the only surviving A7V Sturmpanzerwagen tank from World War I;
- Dinosaurs Unearthed: Explore: Prehistoric Queensland gallery;
- Wild State gallery;
- Discovery Centre gallery; and
- SparkLab.

In 2023, "Kurilpa" was added to the museum's name.

=== Ipswich ("Rail Workshops") ===
Queensland Museum Rail Workshops, located in North Ipswich, was added to the network in 2002. Based in its birthplace, the Workshops' exhibitions explore the evolution of Queensland Rail, with over 17 000 State Collection items. Hosting community events, the annual Day out with Thomas is popular with visitors.

=== Toowoomba ("Cobb+Co") ===
Queensland Museum Cobb+Co, located in East Toowoomba, was added to the network in 1986. From the efforts of businessman Bill Bolton (1905–1973), Cobb+Co is the home of the National Carriage Collection of near fifty horse-drawn vehicles including stagecoaches.

=== Townsville ("Tropics") ===
Queensland Museum Tropics, located in the Townsville City central business district, was added to the network in 1986. The exhibitions focus more on the Queensland's cultures, customs, and environments of the north, including an extensive maritime heritage collection surrounding the wreck of HMS Pandora (1779) which foundered on the Great Barrier Reef in 1791.

=== Museum of Lands, Mapping and Surveying ===
The museum opened in 1982 and is in Edward Street, Brisbane. In 1988 the Queensland Museum became its custodian.

== Exhibitions ==
=== World Science Festival Brisbane ===
The Queensland Museum Network holds exclusive licence to host the World Science Festival in the Asia Pacific region. The inaugural World Science Festival Brisbane was held in 2016. The festival runs in March each year, based at QM Kurilpa, with regional satellite events having taken place in Toowoomba, Townsville and Chinchilla, Queensland.

=== Changing exhibitions ===
The various sites host exhibitions and may rotate exhibitions between sites. Over the years these have included:

- Afghanistan: Hidden treasures from the National Museum, Kabul (5 September 2013 – 27 January 2014) was a major touring exhibition showcasing 230 priceless objects from between 2200 BC and AD 200, with a glimpse into the world of the ancient Silk Road and some of the most remarkable archaeological finds in all of Central Asia. This included jewellery, sculpture and gold work.
- Mummy: Secrets of the tomb (19 April – 21 October 2012) was a major exhibition of four Egyptian mummies and over 100 pieces from the British Museum, London.
- Gladiators: Heroes of the Colosseum (June 2017 – 28 January 2018)
- Egyptian mummies: Discovering ancient lives (16 March – 26 August 2018)
- Discovering Ancient Egypt (2024 – 17 August 2025), an exhibition from the Rijksmuseum van Oudheden.

== Repatriation of human remains and objects ==
The Museum's program of returning and reburying ancestral remains and cultural property belonging to Indigenous Australians, which had been collected by the museum between 1870 and 1970, has been under way since the 1970s. As of November 2018, the Museum had the remains of 660 Aboriginal and Torres Strait Islander people stored in a "secret sacred room" at the QM Kurilpa site.

== See also ==
- List of museums in Queensland
- List of museums in Australia
- Repatriation of human remains – Australia
- Steve Van Dyck, senior curator of vertebrates
- Scott Hocknull (born 1977), senior curator of geology

== Bibliography ==
- Prins, François (Winter 1993). "Brisbane's Heritage". Air Enthusiast. No. 52. pp. 26–27. ISSN 0143-5450.
