= Bungil Formation =

Geological formation in Australia

- Stratigraphic range: Valanginian-Aptian; ~133–120 Ma
- Type: Geological formation
- Unit of: Blythesdale Group
- Sub-units: Claravale Sandstone, Kingull, Minmi & Nullawurt Sandstone Members
- Underlies: Wallumbilla Formation
- Overlies: Mooga Sandstone
- Thickness: Up to 269 m (883 ft)

Lithology
- Primary: Siltstone, mudstone
- Other: Sandstone, coal

Location
- Coordinates: 26°38′31.50″S 148°48′36.18″E
- Approximate paleocoordinates: 71.0°S 122.9°E
- Region: Queensland
- Country: Australia
- Extent: Surat Basin
- Bungil Formation (Australia)

The Bungil Formation is a geological formation in Australia whose strata date back to the Early Cretaceous. Dinosaur remains are among the fossils that have been recovered from the formation.

== Vertebrate paleofauna ==
Color key: Taxon / Reclassified taxon / Taxon falsely reported as present / Dubious taxon or junior synonym / Ichnotaxon / Ootaxon / Morphotaxon	Notes; Uncertain or tentative taxa are in small text; ~~crossed out~~ taxa are discredited.

=== Dinosaurs ===
==== Ornithischians ====
Ornithischians of the Bungil Formation
Genus	Species	Location	Stratigraphic position	Material	Notes	Image
Minmi	M. paravertebra	Queensland, Australia	Aptian to Albian	"Fragmentary postcranial skeleton [and] osteoderms."	A parankylosaur	

== See also ==
- List of dinosaur-bearing rock formations
- South Polar region of the Cretaceous
