= Albert Heber Longman =

Australian palaeontologist

Albert Heber Longman (24 June 1880 – 16 February 1954), also often referred to as Heber Longman or Heber Albert Longman, was an Australian newspaper publisher and museum director of British origin.

== Early years ==
Longman was born at Heytesbury in Wiltshire, England, and educated at Emwell House School in Warminster. Because of a chest weakness, in 1902, he emigrated to Australia and settled in Toowoomba, Queensland. There he, with support from local businesses, established a newspaper initially called the Rag, and later the Citizen. In 1904, he married Irene Maud Bayley, who would become the first woman elected to the Queensland Parliament. Interested in the natural history of the area, Longman collected botanical specimens and helped establish the local field naturalists club. In 1911, he published a book – The Religion of a Naturalist – expressing his philosophical position as an agnostic.

== Queensland Museum ==
In 1911, Longman moved to Brisbane to take up a position as a member of the staff of the Queensland Museum, rising to become acting director in 1917 and director in 1918. There, the main focus of his interests turned from botany to zoology, especially vertebrate paleontology, describing new genera of fish, marine reptiles, dinosaurs and a marsupial. He wished to make the museum more of an educational institution, rather than a repository of fossils. He acquired for the museum several dinosaur skeletons, including the Rhoetosaurus brownei.

He published approximately 70 papers which appeared in the Memoirs of the Queensland Museum. He also wrote a popular column – Nature’s Ways – in the Brisbane Courier-Mail. He retired from the museum in 1945 and died at his home in Brisbane in 1954. He was survived by his wife, Irene Longman.

== Honours and awards ==
- President, Royal Society of Queensland (1919, 1939)
- President, Queensland Naturalists Club
- Vice-chairman, Great Barrier Reef Committee
- Member, Australian National Research Council
- Fellow, Linnean Society of London
- Fellow, Royal Anthropological Institute of Great Britain and Ireland
- Corresponding member, Zoological Society of London
- 1946 – Australian Natural History Medallion
- 1952 – Mueller Medal
