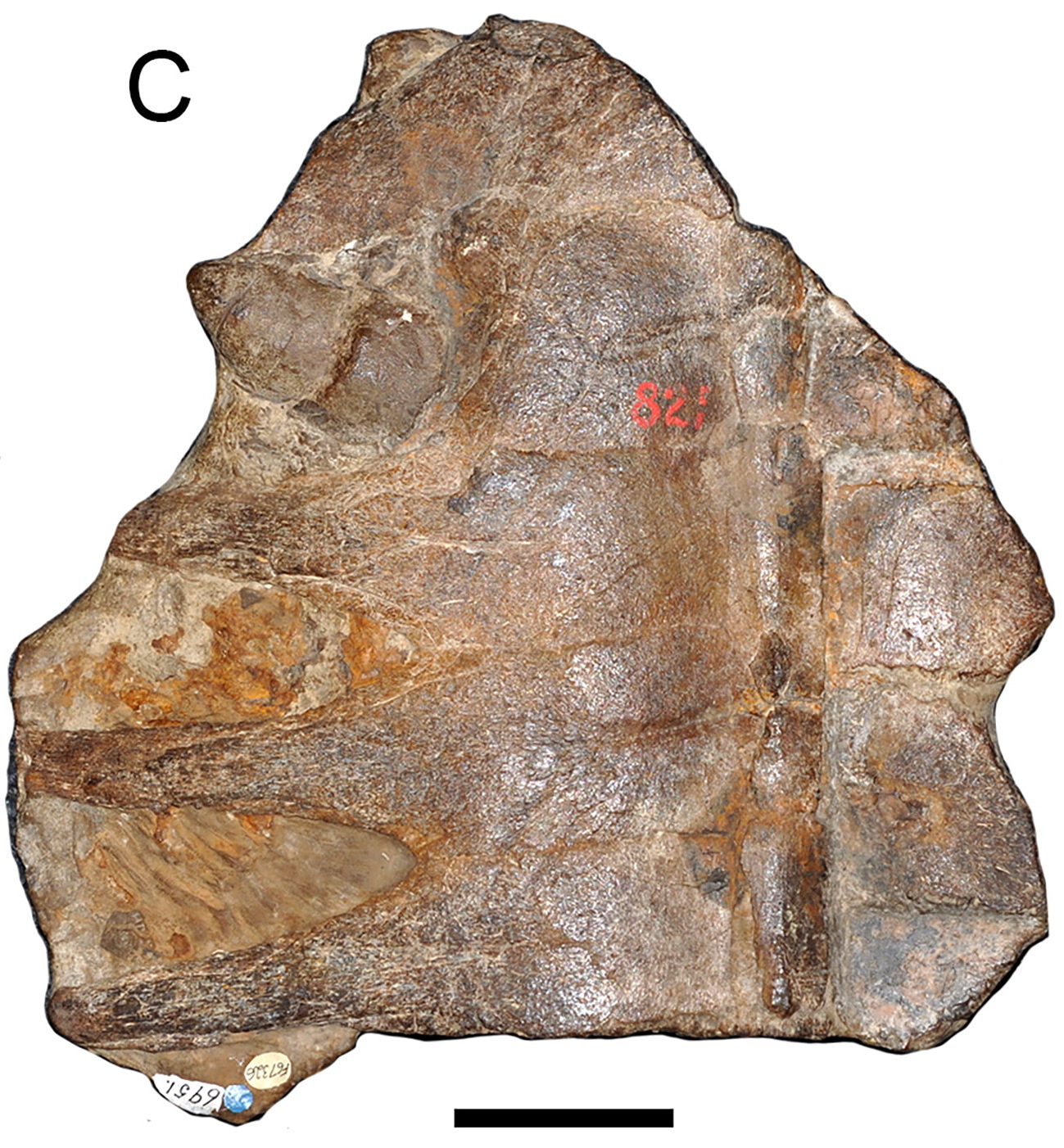
- Type specimen, partial carapace
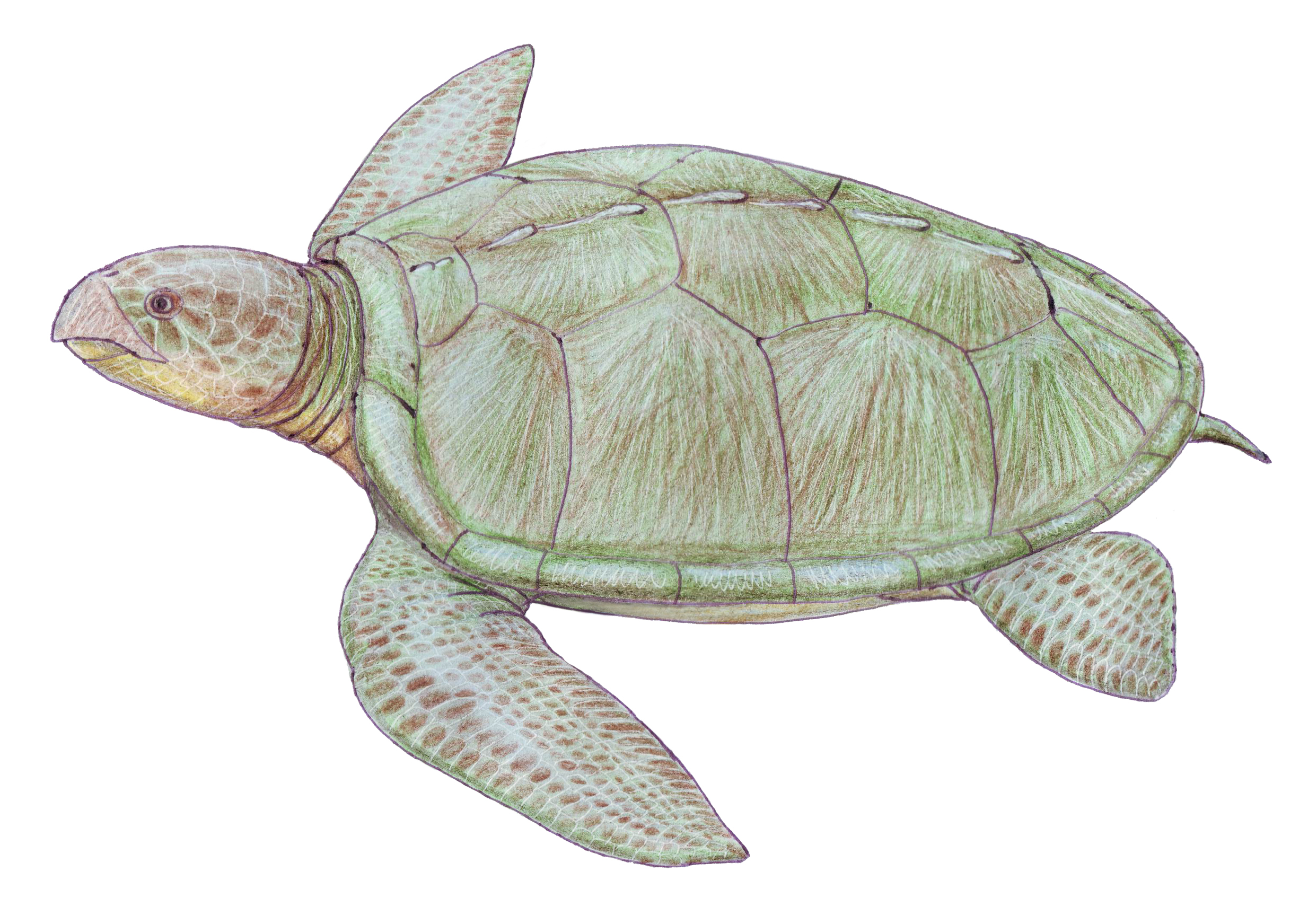
- Restoration

Scientific classification
- Domain: Eukaryota
- Kingdom: Animalia
- Phylum: Chordata
- Class: Reptilia
- Order: Testudines
- Suborder: Cryptodira
- Family: †Protostegidae
- Genus: †Notochelone; Lydekker, 1889

Type species
- †Notochelys costata Owen, 1882

Synonyms
- Notochelys Owen, 1882 (preoccupied)

= Notochelone =

Notochelone Temporal range: Early Cretaceous, 109–99 Ma

Extinct genus of turtles

Notochelone is an extinct genus of sea turtle, which existed about 100 million years ago. The species was first described by Richard Owen in 1882 as Notochelys costata. It was renamed by Richard Lydekker in 1889. It was the most common marine reptile living in the inlands of the sea around Queensland, Australia. It was small turtle with carapace less than 1 metre (3.3 ft). Analytical studies have indicated that the creatures frequently ate benthic molluscs.
