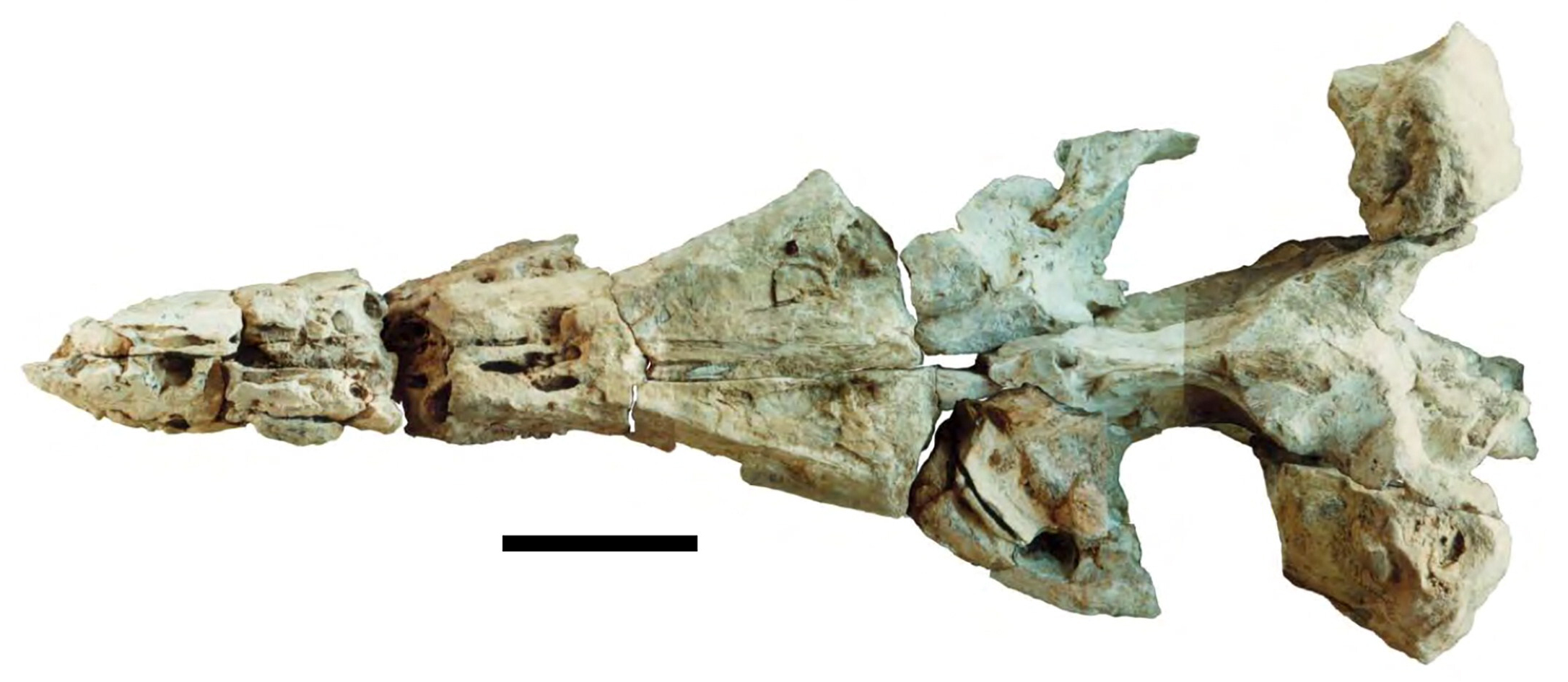
- The skull of one of the proposed neotype specimens of K. queenslandicus (QM F18827)

Scientific classification
- Kingdom: Animalia
- Phylum: Chordata
- Class: Reptilia
- Superorder: †Sauropterygia
- Order: †Plesiosauria
- Suborder: †Pliosauroidea
- Family: †Pliosauridae
- Subfamily: †Brachaucheninae
- Genus: †Kronosaurus; Longman, 1924

Type species
- †Kronosaurus queenslandicus Longman, 1924

Synonyms
- Eiectus longmani? Noè & Gómez-Pérez, 2022

= Kronosaurus =

Kronosaurus Temporal range: Early Cretaceous (Aptian-Albian) ~125–100.5 Ma }

Pliosaur genus from the Early Cretaceous period of Australia

Kronosaurus (/ˌkrɒnoʊˈsɔːrəs/ KRON-oh-SOR-əs) is an extinct genus of large short-necked pliosaur that lived during the Aptian to Albian stages of the Early Cretaceous in what is now Australia. The first known specimen was received in 1899 and consists of a partially preserved mandibular symphysis, which was first thought to come from an ichthyosaur according to Charles De Vis. However, it was in 1924 that Albert Heber Longman formally described this specimen as the holotype of an imposing pliosaurid, to which he gave the scientific name K. queenslandicus, which is still the only recognized species nowadays. The genus name, meaning "lizard of Kronos", refers to its large size and possible ferocity reminiscent of the Titan of the Greek mythology, while the species name alludes to Queensland, the Australian state of its discovery. In the early 1930s, the Harvard Museum of Comparative Zoology sent an organized expedition to Australia that recovered two specimens historically attributed to the taxon, including a well known skeleton that is now massively restored in plaster. Several attributed fossils were subsequently discovered, including two large, more or less partial skeletons. As the holotype specimen does not present diagnostics to concretely distinguish Kronosaurus from other pliosaurids, these same two skeletons are proposed as potential neotypes for future redescriptions. Two additional species were proposed, but these are now seen as unlikely or belonging to another genus.

Kronosaurus is one of the largest known pliosaurs identified to date. Initial estimates set its maximum size at around 13 m (43 ft) long based on the Harvard skeleton. However, this skeleton had been reconstructed with an exaggerated number of vertebrae, so estimates published from the early 2000s reduce the size of the animal from 9 m (30 ft) to more than 10 m (33 ft) long. Like all plesiosaurs, Kronosaurus has four paddle-like limbs, a short tail and, like most pliosaurids, a long head and a short neck. The largest identified skulls of Kronosaurus dwarf those of the largest known theropod dinosaurs in size. The front of the skull is elongated into a rostrum (snout). The mandibular symphysis, where the front ends of each side of the mandible (lower jaw) fuse, is elongated in Kronosaurus, and contains up to six pairs of teeth. The large cone-shaped teeth of Kronosaurus would have been used for a diet consisting of large prey. The front teeth are larger than the back teeth. The limbs of Kronosaurus were modified into flippers, with the back pair larger than the front. The flippers would have given a wingspan of more than 5 m (16 ft) for the largest representatives.

Phylogenetic classifications published since 2013 recover Kronosaurus within the subfamily Brachaucheninae, a lineage which includes numerous pliosaurids that lived during different stages of the Cretaceous. Based on its stratigraphic distribution in the fossil record, Kronosaurus inhabited the Eromanga Sea, an ancient inland sea that covered a large part of Australia during the Early Cretaceous. This inner sea reached cold temperatures close to freezing. Kronosaurus would likely have been an apex predator in this sea, with fossil evidence showing that it preyed on sea turtles and other plesiosaurs. Estimates of its bite force suggest that the animal would have reached between 15,000 to 27,000 newtons (3,370 to 6,070 lbf). The skull of a juvenile specimen shows that it would have been attacked by an adult, indicating intraspecific aggression or even potential evidence of cannibalism within the genus. Kronosaurus would have faced interspecific competition with other large predators within this sea, with one attributed specimen showing bite marks from a Cretoxyrhina-like shark.

== Research history ==
=== Initial finds and research ===
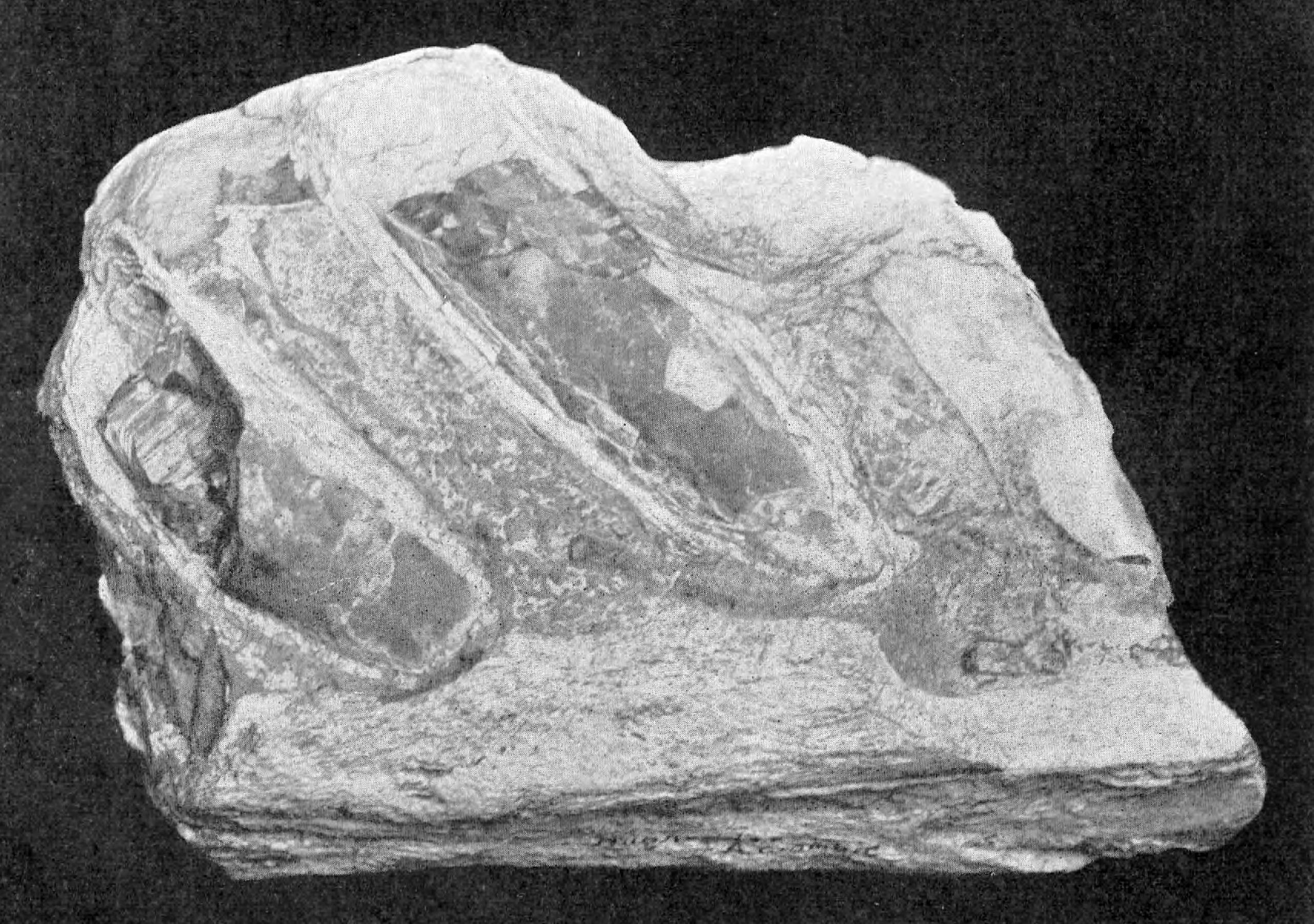
The holotype mandibular symphysis of K. queenslandicus (QM F1609)

In 1899, a partial fossil of a marine reptile was sent on behalf of a certain Andrew Crombie to the Queensland Museum of Brisbane, Australia, and was received by the zoologist Charles De Vis, who was then the director of the museum during that time. No information regarding the origin locality of the fossil is known, but it seems that it was probably discovered near of Hughenden, Queensland, a town from which Crombie comes. Queensland Museum records show that De Vis even sent a letter to Crombie informing him that he had been made aware of the receipt of the material. The fossil in question, cataloged as QM F1609, consists of a partial mandibular symphysis bearing six conical teeth. Based on his observations, De Vis considers the fossil to come from a representative of the Enaliosauria, a now obsolete taxon which included plesiosaurs and ichthyosaurs. De Vis initially thought the specimen came from an ichthyosaur, specifically Ichthyosaurus australis, which today seems to be placed in the genus Platypterygius. However, the particular dentition of this specimen quickly makes it change its mind about whether it belongs to this specific genus. The fossil was officially described by De Vis's successor, Albert Heber Longman, in a scientific article published in 1924 by the journal of the Queensland Museum. Longman deduces that the fossil comes from a large pliosaur, to which he gives the genus and species name Kronosaurus queenslandicus. The generic name comes from Kronos, a Titan from the Greek mythology, and from ancient Ancient Greek σαῦρος (saûros, "lizard"), to literally give "lizard of Kronos". Longman would have created this generic name in reference to the imposing size and possible ferocity of the animal, which could recall the story of Kronos, who is known in Greek mythology for having devoured his own children, notably Zeus. The specific epithet queenslandicus is named after the Queensland, the Australian state where the holotype specimen was most likely discovered.

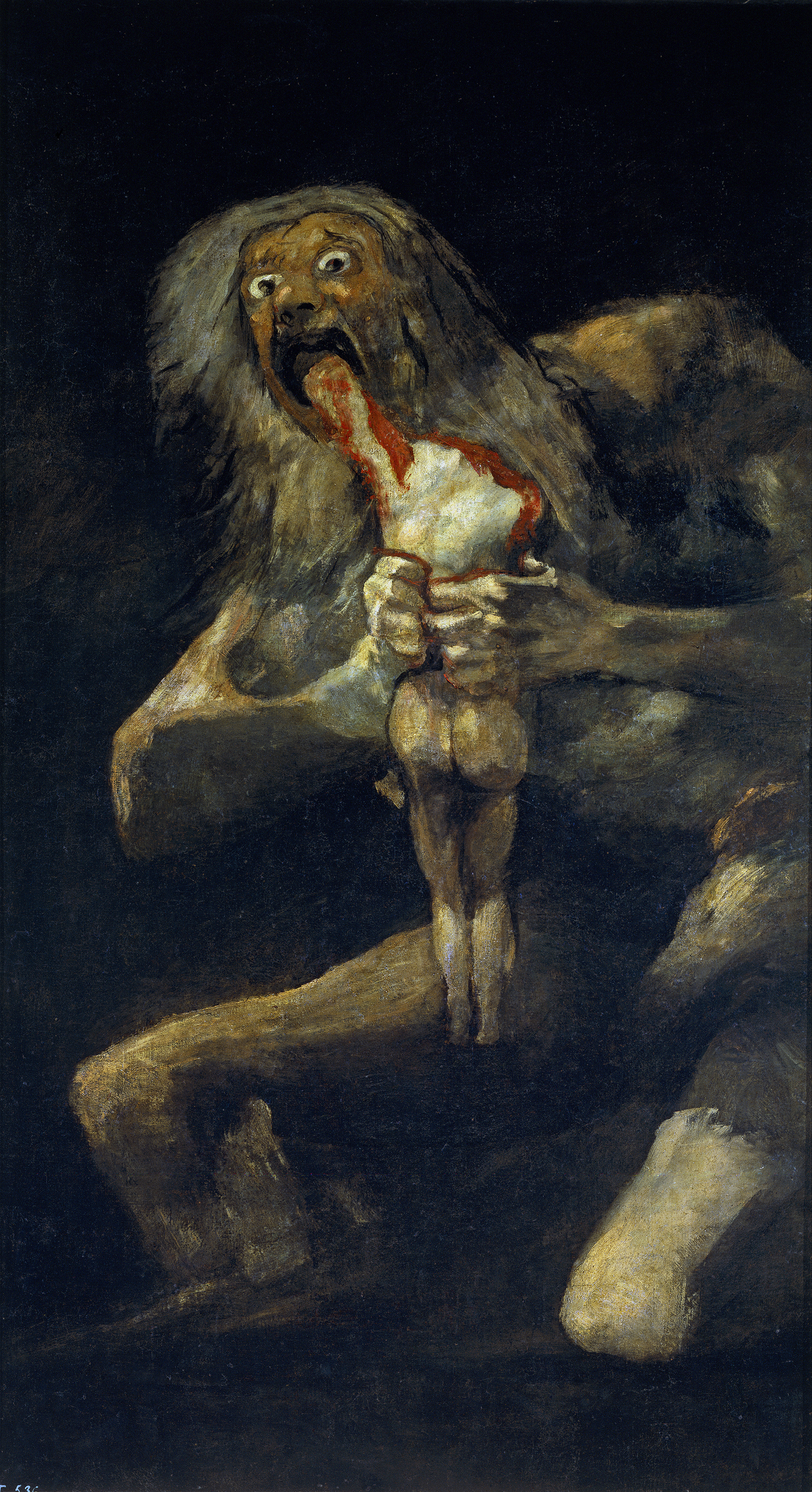
Saturn Devouring His Son, artist's impression by Francisco de Goya, painted between 1820 and 1823, representing the Titan of the Greek mythology Kronos. Kronosaurus is named in reference to the latter for its large size and its possible ferocity reminiscent of the character

In August 1929, fifteen more or less partial fossils are discovered nearly 3.2 km south of Hughenden. These same fossils, all catalogued as QM F2137, are identified as coming from the Toolebuc Formation, dating from the Albian stage of the Early Cretaceous, the holotype having very probably also been discovered in this same locality. The majority of the material recovered is then very incomplete, the only two that can be concretely described being proximal parts of propodials (upper limb bones), which are analyzed in more detail the following year, and those again by Longman. In 1932, in an effort to make the animal's fossils "attractive", Longman published one of the oldest known reconstructions of Kronosaurus. The illustration was drawn in 1931 by a certain Wilfrid Morden, who was inspired in particular by the anatomical features of Peloneustes to fill in the still unknown parts of the animal. In May and April 1935, a certain J. Edgar Young for the Queensland Museum, collected several fossils from the Toolebuc Formation, more precisely from the Telemon station, about 30 km west of Hughenden. Among all the fossils Young was involved in exhuming are additional remains attributed to Kronosaurus, including the first somewhat more complete cranial parts identified within the genus. In his article published in October 1935, Longman, due to the high number of fossils, suggested that they came from at least two or three individuals. Noting that the fossils were not fully prepared at the time of his description, he describes them preliminary. The most notable specimen, cataloged as QM F2446, consists of a partial middle of the skull which preserves an occipital condyle, the back of the neurocranium, the external nostrils as well as the orbits.

=== Harvard expedition ===
In 1931, the Museum of Comparative Zoology sent an expedition to Australia with the dual aim of obtaining specimens of both living and extinct animals, and in particular marsupial mammals. This decision came from the fact that the museum had relatively few Australian animals and therefore wanted to collect more. It was then that the Harvard Australian Expedition began, and was undertaken by a team of six men. The team consisted of coleopterologist P. Jackson Darlington Jr., zoologist Glover Morrill Allen and his student Ralph Nicholson Ellis, chief physician Ira M. Dixon, paleontologist William E. Schevill, and their leader, entomologist William Morton Wheeler. The following year, in 1932, it was Schevill who acquired the title of expedition leader, making long journeys and recruiting local help when he could. The Queensland Museum was also invited to participate in this expedition, but this was never approved due to lack of funds and/or interest from the state government. However, Longman, who described the first known fossils of Kronosaurus, nevertheless assisted the expedition, storing specimens as they were sent to him, securing collecting permits, and maintaining correspondence with Schevill. Schevill then ventured into the Rolling Downs geological group, north of the town of Richmond, where he collected two large pliosaur specimens. These same specimens are collected from the Doncaster Member of the Wallumbilla Formation, dating back approximately 112 million years. The first specimen he exhumed, cataloged as MCZ 1284 and discovered on a property called Grampian Valley, consisted of a well-preserved piece of the anterior rostrum closely connected to the entire mandibular symphysis, in addition to several other fragmentary pieces.

The story regarding the discovery, exhumation and exhibition of the second specimen, cataloged as MCZ 1285, is much more detailed in many historical sources. This specimen was discovered long before the Harvard Expedition was even launched, by a rancher named Ralph William Haslam Thomas, in a locality known as Army Downs. The latter had been aware for many years of the presence of "something strange coming out of the ground" in a small horse enclosure. These "strange things" were actually a row of vertebrae contained in nodules. Noticing his discovery, Thomas therefore informed the members of the Harvard expedition, and notably Schevill. The latter then contacts a British migrant trained in the use of explosives, nicknamed "The Maniac" (Note: The nickname given to this enigmatic character is due to the fact that rumors persisted that he apparently killed a man.) by local residents, in order to extract the specimen of 4.5 metric tons (5.0 short tons) of rock which constitutes its geological matrix. When the specimen was unearthed, its fossils were then sent to the United States in 86 crates weighing a total of 6 metric tons (6.6 short tons). According to the export permit, the specimen was transported aboard the SS Canadian Constructor around 1 December 1932. Once arrived at Harvard, the fossils, which represent approximately 60% of the skeleton, took several years to extract from the limestone because of the lack of money, manpower and space within the museum. One year earlier, in 1934, Schevill asked Longman to send a cast of the holotype mandibular symphysis for comparison with the new specimen. It was then Longman's assistant, a certain Tom Marshall, who took it upon himself to make Schevill's request. The researchers then realized that the characters of the holotype (QM F1609) were identical to those of the Harvard specimen (MCZ 1285). Longman, in his letters to Schevill, suggests that he would have enjoyed seeing the specimen during its preparation in the late 1930s, but he never left Australian territory. A first scientific description of the skull was made by Theodore E. White in 1935, before it began to be exhibited in the museum four years later, in 1939.

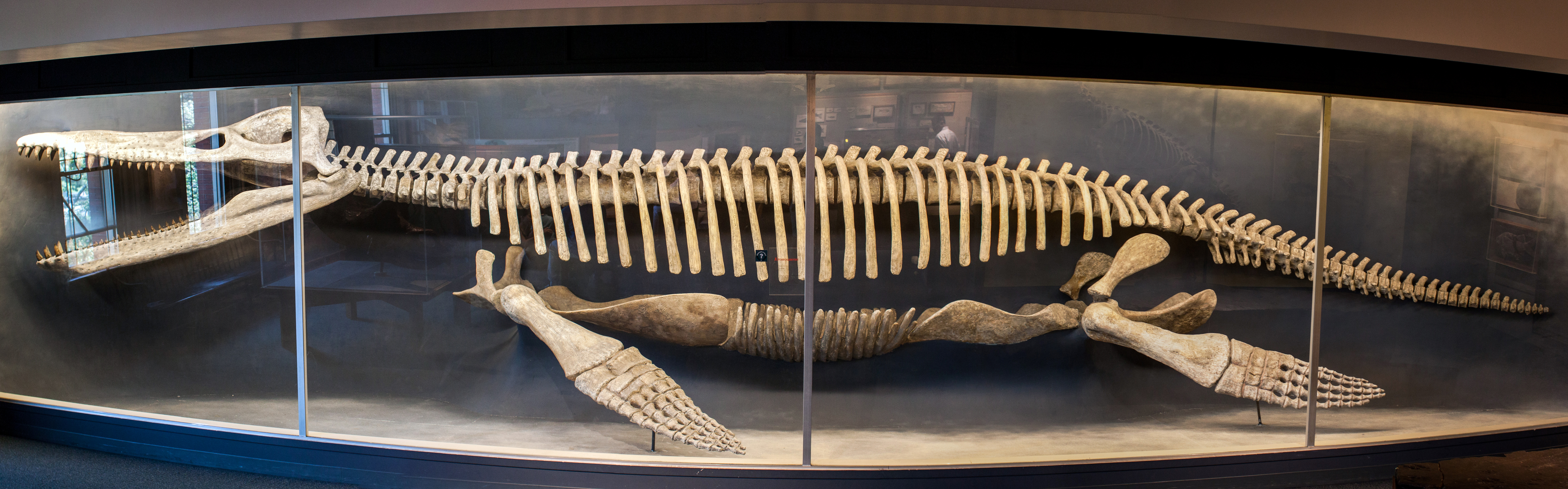
The mounted skeleton at Harvard's Museum of Comparative Zoology historically attributed to Kronosaurus (MCZ 1285), sometimes nicknamed "Plasterosaurus", was reconstructed with an excessive number of vertebrae and inaccurate cranial proportions.

The rest of the skeleton was kept in the basement of the museum for more than fifteen years. This interim period ended when the fossils attracted the attention of Godfrey Lowell Cabot, a Boston industrialist, philanthropist and founder of the Cabot Corporation. Cabot's family had a history of sighting large sea snakes in the coastal waters around the town he is from. When questioning the museum's director, Alfred Sherwood Romer, about the existence and reports of sea serpents, it occurred to Romer to tell Cabot about the skeleton kept in the museum's basement. So Cabot asks about the cost of a restoration and Romer says "about $10,000". Romer may not have been serious, but Cabot clearly was because the check for said sum came shortly after. Given that Romer's primary interest was the study of non-mammalian synapsids, it is possible that he had little regard for the skeleton as a subject of scientific study. After two years of careful preparations with chisel and acid by Arnold Lewis and James A. Jensen under Romer's direction, their work ultimately cost slightly more than promised by Cabot's base check. The Harvard skeleton was exhibited for the first time on 10 June 1958, and is followed by a detailed scientific description carried out by Romer and Lewis, which was published the following year by the museum journal. When the finalization of the specimen was announced in the Australian press, Longman, who is the descriptor of the taxon, was not mentioned. In response, professor and geologist Walter Heywood Bryan sent a message via telegraph informing journalists that it would be regrettable if such an important announcement made no mention of Longman and the interpretation of the initially fragmentary fossil material. At the age of 93, Thomas, the original discoverer of the specimen, was able to see the mounted skeleton of what he considered "his dinosaur", as well as meet again the leader of the museum's former expedition, each believing that the other had been dead for a long time.

The arrival of new knowledge in the field of paleontology subsequently calls into question the restoration of the skeleton as proposed by Romer. Indeed, because of many incomplete bones, the latter ordered Lewis and Jensen to add plaster where he deemed it necessary. This latest decision has made it difficult for paleontologists to access real fossils, to the point where some of them use the humoristic nickname "Plasterosaurus" to refer to the specimen. In addition, it seems that the skeleton was reconstructed with the wrong proportions. According to Australian paleontologist Colin McHenry, the specimen has eight extra vertebrae added to the spine and the skull is not supposed to have a bulbous shaped sagittal crest on top. In his thesis revising the genus Kronosaurus published in 2009, McHenry called the Harvard skeleton "a rather disappointing restoration of what must have been an excellent fossil specimen". For this reason, many researchers express their desire to analyze real fossils using CT scans.

=== Later discoveries and genus validity ===
Various fossil localities of Kronosaurus. (Note: This map also includes the specimens discovered during the Harvard expedition, which have been provisionally assigned to Eiectus since 2022.) Legend: Aptian localities Albian localities Aptian-Albian localities

Given that the holotype specimen of K. queenslandicus (QM F1609) is fragmentary and does not present any unique characteristics that would qualify the genus as distinct from other pliosaurs, the validity of this taxon has therefore been questioned. As early as 1962, Samuel Paul Welles considered Kronosaurus as a nomen vanum and recommended the designation of a neotype specimen from Harvard University which would preserve the genus validity. (Note: No details were given by Welles as to which Harvard specimen should be designated as a neotype, as several were discovered by the university's expedition. It is, however, very likely that Welles would have been referring to MCZ 1285, given that it is the most complete specimen discovered by the Harvard expedition.) From 1979, a good number of fossils from large pliosaurs were discovered in various localities in Australia, mainly in the geological strata of the Toolebuc Formation, the formation from which the first fossils attributed to the genus were discovered. In other formations, only one additional attributed specimen was discovered in the Doncaster Member of the Wallumbilla Formation, while three specimens, including one attributed to the type species, were discovered in the Allaru Formation. Two specimens with no specific affiliation were identified in the Bulldog Shale. In his 2009 thesis, McHenry describes in detail many fossils attributed to Kronosaurus, including most of the new specimens that he judges to possibly belong to this genus. (Note: Some specimens like QM F18762, which consists of an almost complete skull, are not analyzed due to the fact that no preparation was made to allow a clear description.) Of the numerous fossil specimens that he analyzed, McHenry proposed that two partial skeletons, cataloged as QM F10113 and QM F18827, which both come from the Toolebuc Formation, could be candidate neotypes, because they present features that seem to fit with the holotype. However, no formal ICZN petition to designate a neotype was submitted. In 2022, Leslie Francis Noè and Marcela Gómez-Pérez published a study that revised most of the specimens historically attributed to Kronosaurus. Both authors limit Kronosaurus only to the holotype and consider it a nomen dubium. The holotype specimen does not possess any features allowing a diagnostic, the other attributed fossils are provisionally moved to a new taxon that the two authors name Eiectus longmani, in homage to Longman, the paleontologist who named the original genus. The Harvard skeleton (MCZ 1285) is also designated a holotype of this same genus.

In 2023, Valentin Fischer and colleagues criticized the reassignments even under these circumstances, predicting that they stand contrary to ICZN Articles 75.5 and 75.6 (Note: These two articles codifies preference for neotype designation for emblematic taxa with non-diagnostic type specimens.) and that the aforementioned multiple-species possibility cannot justify a tentative reassignment of all specimens to Eiectus. The authors instead opted to refer to all relevant fossils as Kronosaurus-Eiectus. The same year, Stephen F. Poropat and colleagues maintained K. queenslandicus as a nominally valid taxon that includes all fossils from the Toolebuc and Allaru Formation pending an official ICZN petition, recommending specimen QM F18827 as neotype. The authors also criticize the repurposing of Toolebuc specimens, on the grounds that Noè and Gómez-Pérez presumably ignored the conclusion of McHenry's 2009 thesis that only one species of large pliosaur exists in the formation and that, therefore, all of its specimens can be reliably considered conspecific to the holotype. As for Eiectus, Poropat and colleagues limit it only to MCZ 1285 and the referred specimen MCZ 1284, but their assignment without formal redescription also remains subject to debate, given that the holotype is so massively restored with plaster that all features apparent diagnostics are probably unreliable without comprehensive CT scans.

=== Proposed and formerly classified species ===
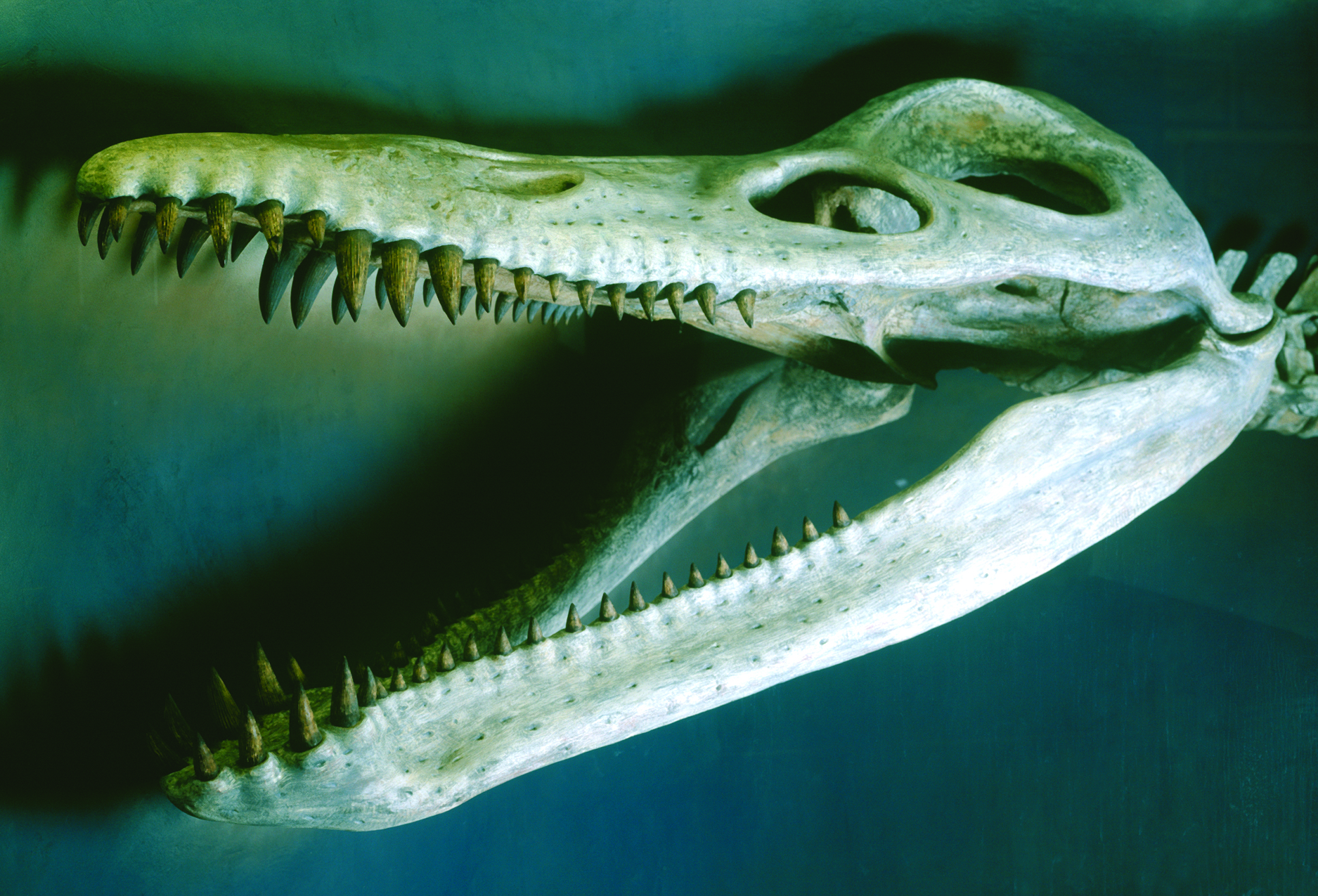
The Harvard skeleton was proposed to belong to another species of Kronosaurus based on suggested cranial differences.

Although the only currently recognized species of Kronosaurus is K. queenslandicus, several authors have suggested the existence of additional species within the genus. In 1982 and again in 1991, Ralph Molnar expressed doubts as to whether the Harvard skeleton (MCZ 1285) belonged to the species K. queenslandicus, given that it was discovered in a locality distinct from that of the first known specimens, namely in the older Wallumbilla Formation. The author therefore suggests that this specimen would belong to another species of Kronosaurus characterized by a deeper and more robust skull than those coming from the Toolebuc Formation. A study published in 1993 also attributes the specimen under the name Kronosaurus sp., the authors following the same opinion as Molnar. However, as White indicates in his description of the specimen in 1935, much of the skull roof is not preserved and is mostly restored in plaster, the real proportions being therefore uncertain. In his 2009 thesis, McHenry nevertheless continues to refer the specimen to K. queenslandicus because of its taphonomic distribution and certain traits which may be consistent with other specimens discovered in the Toolebuc Formation. To determine whether this statement is true, only a CT scan could reveal the presence of the true notable differences within this reconstructed plaster specimen.

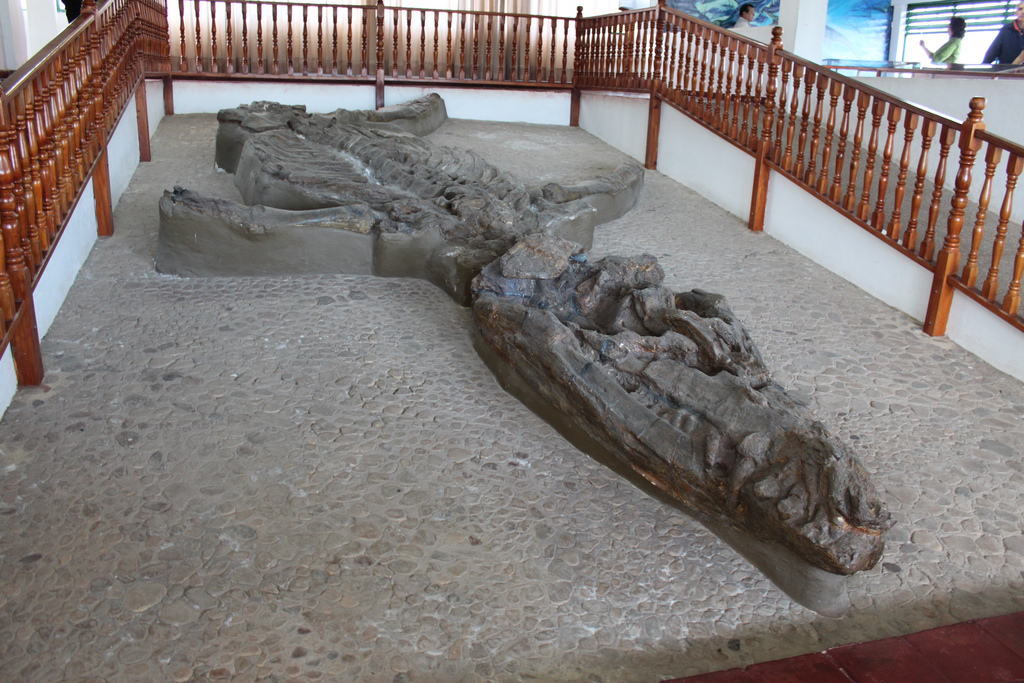
Holotype skeleton of Monquirasaurus, which was formerly classified as K. boyacensis

In 1977, an almost complete skeleton of a large pliosaur was discovered by local residents of the town of Villa de Leyva, Colombia. The specimen, nicknamed "El Fósil" and dating from the Upper Aptian of the Paja Formation, was first provisionally referred to the genus Kronosaurus two years later, in 1979. It was in 1992 that the German paleontologist Olivier Hampe established a second species of the genus under the name of K. boyacensis, the specific name referring to Boyacá, the department surrounding the discovery site. However, these descriptions were made from photographs and remote imaging techniques, in particular because access to the specimen was prohibited by the local community. In addition, the state of preservation of the specimen and anatomical characteristics different from those of K. queenslandicus also suggested doubts about the affiliation of this species to Kronosaurus. It was therefore in 2022 that Noè and Gómez-Pérez re-described this specimen and discovered that it belonged to a distinct genus, which they named Monquirasaurus, in reference to Monquirá, the administrative division where the specimen was discovered.

== Description ==
Due to the fact that the holotype specimen of Kronosaurus is non-diagnostic, the majority of anatomical descriptions are based on observations made from more complete fossils later assigned to the genus. The majority of descriptions come from McHenry's thesis published in 2009, although some specimens have been described in other works. Plesiosaurs are usually categorized as belonging to the small-headed, long-necked "plesiosauromorph" morphotype or the large-headed, short-necked "pliosauromorph" morphotype, Kronosaurus belonging to the latter category. Like all plesiosaurs, it had a short tail, a massive trunk and two pairs of large flippers.

=== Size ===
Size of the largest specimen traditionally attributed to Kronosaurus (MCZ 1285) with a human. The light gray diagram represents the size of the specimen as it is currently mounted at the MCZ, while the dark gray one shows it with a more accurate estimate

Kronosaurus is one of the largest pliosaurs identified to date, but several estimates as to its exact size have been proposed during research. As early as 1930, Longman, in his description of propodiums, considered that Kronosaurus would have exceeded in size the imposing Megalneusaurus, a North American pliosaurid dating from the Late Jurassic. After the collection of fossils assigned to the genus by the Harvard Expedition, the maximum size of Kronosaurus was generally set at 12.8 meters (42 ft) long, based on specimen MCZ 1285. Kronosaurus was then considered as being the largest known marine reptile until 1995, when Theagarten Lingham-Soliar suggested that the Late Cretaceous aquatic squamate Mosasaurus hoffmannii would reach around 18 meters (59 ft) long, the latter having a reduced size to around 11 meters (36 ft) according to more recent estimates. Currently, the largest marine reptile identified to date is the Late Triassic ichthyosaur Ichthyotitan, which is thought to have reached around 25 meters (82 ft) in length. The Harvard skeleton restoration being erroneous, McHenry gives a smaller size of this specimen between 10.5 and 10.9 meters (34 and 36 ft) long for a body mass of 10.6–12.1 t (10.4–11.9 long tons; 11.7–13.3 short tons). These same measurements are seen as the maximum possible estimates of the genus as a whole. Even before McHenry's thesis was published, paleontologist Benjamin P. Kear and marine biologist Richard Ellis proposed comparable estimates in their respective works both published in 2003, ranging from 9 meters (30 ft) according to Kear at 10.6 meters (35 ft) according to Ellis. In 2026, Ruizhe Jackevan Zhao revises the measurements of MCZ 1285 at 10.45 meters (34.3 ft) in total body length and 11.4 t (11.2 long tons; 12.6 short tons) in body mass.

Other specimens have been given body estimates although some of these are only known from more limited fossil remains. (Note: Body length estimates for these specimens are based on comparisons made with MCZ 1285 and QM F10113 in McHenry's 2009 thesis.) QM F1609, the holotype specimen, although very fragmentary, would have measured 5.9 meters (19 ft) long. The proposed neotype specimen QM F18827 would have reached a length of 8.9 meters (29 ft). The most complete known attributed specimen, QM F10113, would have reached slightly smaller measurements, namely 8.6 meters (28 ft) long with a body mass of around 5.7 t (5.6 long tons; 6.3 short tons). The largest specimens of Kronosaurus having been discovered in the Toolebuc Formation, QM F2446 and QM F2454, would have reached measurements almost identical to that of the Harvard skeleton. Respectively, these two specimens would have reached 10.2 to 10.56 meters (33.5 to 34.6 ft) in length.

=== Skull ===
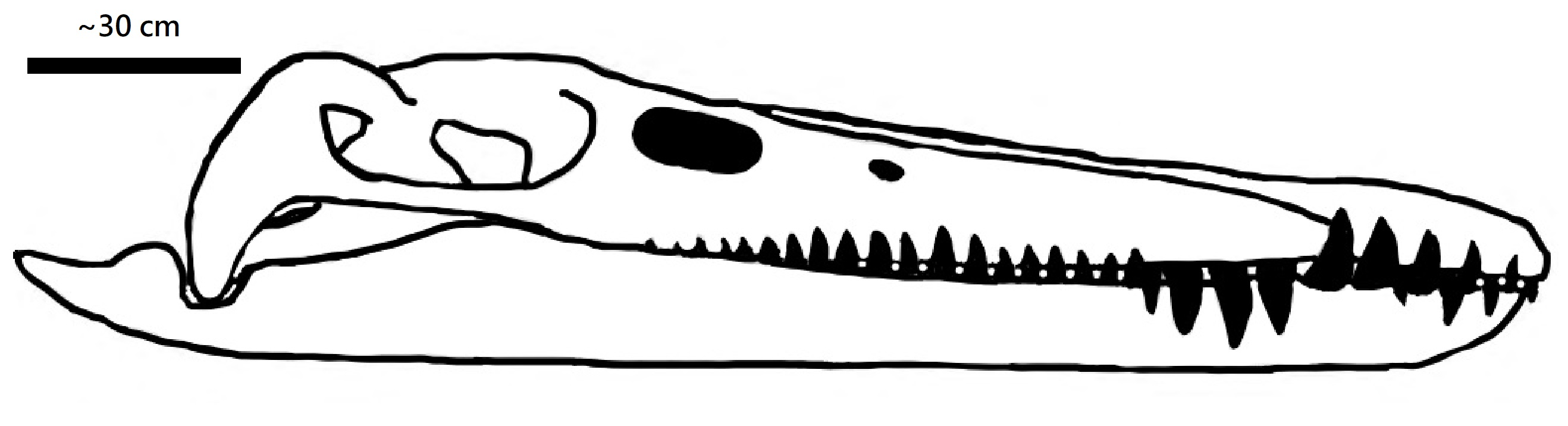
Reconstructed skull

Since the holotype of K. queenslandicus (QM F1609) consists of only a partial mandibular symphysis, very little can be said about it. However, more complete fossil skulls that are assigned to the taxon show unique traits. The skulls of various known specimens of Kronosaurus vary in size. The holotype, which although partial and fragmentary, comes from a skull which would have measured a total of 1.31 metres (4.3 ft) long. Candidate neotype specimens QM F10113 and QM F18827 have cranial lengths reaching 1.87–1.98 metres (6.1–6.5 ft), respectively. The skull of the Harvard skeleton is estimated to be 2.85 metres (9.4 ft) long. (Note: Many previous estimates of the skull size of this skeleton have been proposed throughout descriptions. In 1935, White proposed that the skull would reach a length of 3.72 metres (12.2 ft), while McHenry gives a smaller estimate of 2.21 metres (7.3 ft) in 2009. Knutsen et al. (2012) further reduced the skull length of this specimen at 2.19 metres (7.2 ft).) The cranial measurements of the last three specimens previously cited surpass in size the skull of any known theropod dinosaurs. The snout and the mandibular rostrum are long and narrow in shape. The rostrum in general appears to be arched in shape and is relatively elongated, possessing a distinct median and dorsal crest. The eye sockets face obliquely posteriorly, where they are located laterally on the anterior half of the skull. The temporal fossae (openings in the top back of the cranium) are very large, but the skull does not have an anterior interpterygoid vacuity.

One of the many traits identified as unique in Kronosaurus is that the premaxilla (front upper tooth-bearing bone) has four instead of five or more caniniform teeth. (Note: Of all the known specimens, QM F10113 is the only one that shows only three.) The frontal bones (bones bordering the eye sockets) do not come into contact with the margin of the eye sockets due to the connection between the postfrontal and prefrontal bones. The frontal bones also do not come into contact with the middle part of the skull roof due to the connection between the parietal bones and posterior facial processes of the premaxillae. The prefrontals are large and contact the anteromedial part of the eye sockets as well as the posterior border of the nostrils. The lacrimal bones (bones bordering the lower front edges of the eye sockets) are present in small specimens, but tend to be fused in adults. The dorsal surface of the median dorsal crest is formed by the premaxillae and nasal bones (bones bordering the external nares), which in adults are fused. The hyoid bones are robust.

The mandibular symphysis of Kronosaurus is elongated and spatulate (spoon-shaped), and like its close relatives Brachauchenius and Megacephalosaurus, it contains up to six pairs of teeth. Each dentary (the tooth-bearing bone in the mandible) has up to 26 teeth. The mandibular glenoid (socket of the jaw joint) is kidney-shaped and angled upwards and inwards. The main autapomorphy of Kronosaurus teeth is that they are conical in shape, roughly ridged, and lacking distinct carinae. The dentition of Kronosaurus is heterodont, that is, it has teeth of different shapes. The larger teeth are caniniform and located at the front of the jaws, while the smaller teeth are more sharply recurved, stouter, and located further back.

=== Postcranial skeleton ===
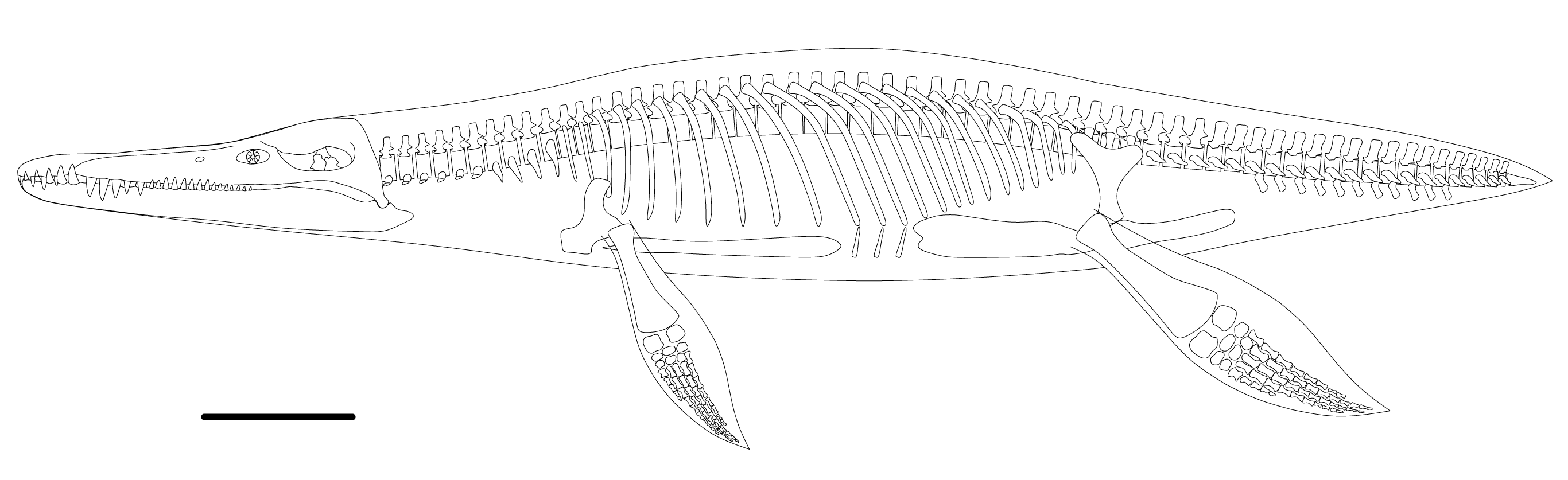
Skeletal reconstruction

The Harvard skeleton historically attributed to Kronosaurus received a study detailing its postcranial anatomy by Romer and Lewis in 1959. However, as the latter was massively restored in plaster, it is currently difficult to discern the real fossil material. Additionally, the specimen is temporarily referred to Eiectus; CT scans may in time reveal whether or not the specimen belongs to Kronosaurus. Many Kronosaurus specimens preserve postcranial material. The most complete specimen known, catalogued as QM F10113, preserves an important part of the postcranial anatomy which could reveal important information for a more in-depth diagnosis of the taxon. This same specimen should also be described in more detail in a future study. Some features concerning the postcranial anatomy of the genus have however been noted, both in McHenry's thesis and in other articles.

Based on the different specimens analyzed, McHenry estimates that Kronosaurus would have had at least 35 presacral vertebrae, including thirteen cervical and five pectoral vertebra. Unlike Pliosaurus, the cervical centra (vertebral bodies) are wider than the dorsals. The anterior dorsal vertebrae are higher than wide. The zygapophyses would have been visibly absent from the anterior dorsal vertebrae and in the caudal vertebrae. In the thoracic region, the ribs would have been robust, as suggested by the transverse processes which are equally robust. The ribs would also been single-headed. Although the tail of Kronosaurus is unknown from articulated specimens, the end of the caudal vertebrae would have supported a small caudal fin like in other plesiosaurs. The coracoid and pubis are both elongated from front to back. The hindlimbs of Kronosaurus are longer than its forelimbs, with the femur being longer and more robust than the humerus. This suggests that the largest representatives of Kronosaurus would have rear flippers which would have formed a wingspan exceeding 5 m (16 ft).

== Classification and evolution ==
De Vis initially suggested that the Kronosaurus holotype specimen belonged to an ichthyosaur. However, when Longman described the taxon in 1924, he assigned it to the family Pliosauridae based on multiple anatomical features, an affiliation which will be mainly recognized throughout the 20th century as well as in the 21st century by the scientific community. However, some alternative classifications have been proposed throughout research. For example, in 1962, Welles suggested that Kronosaurus possibly belonged to the family Dolichorhynchopidae. However, this family is today recognized as polyphyletic (unnatural grouping) and is seen as invalid.

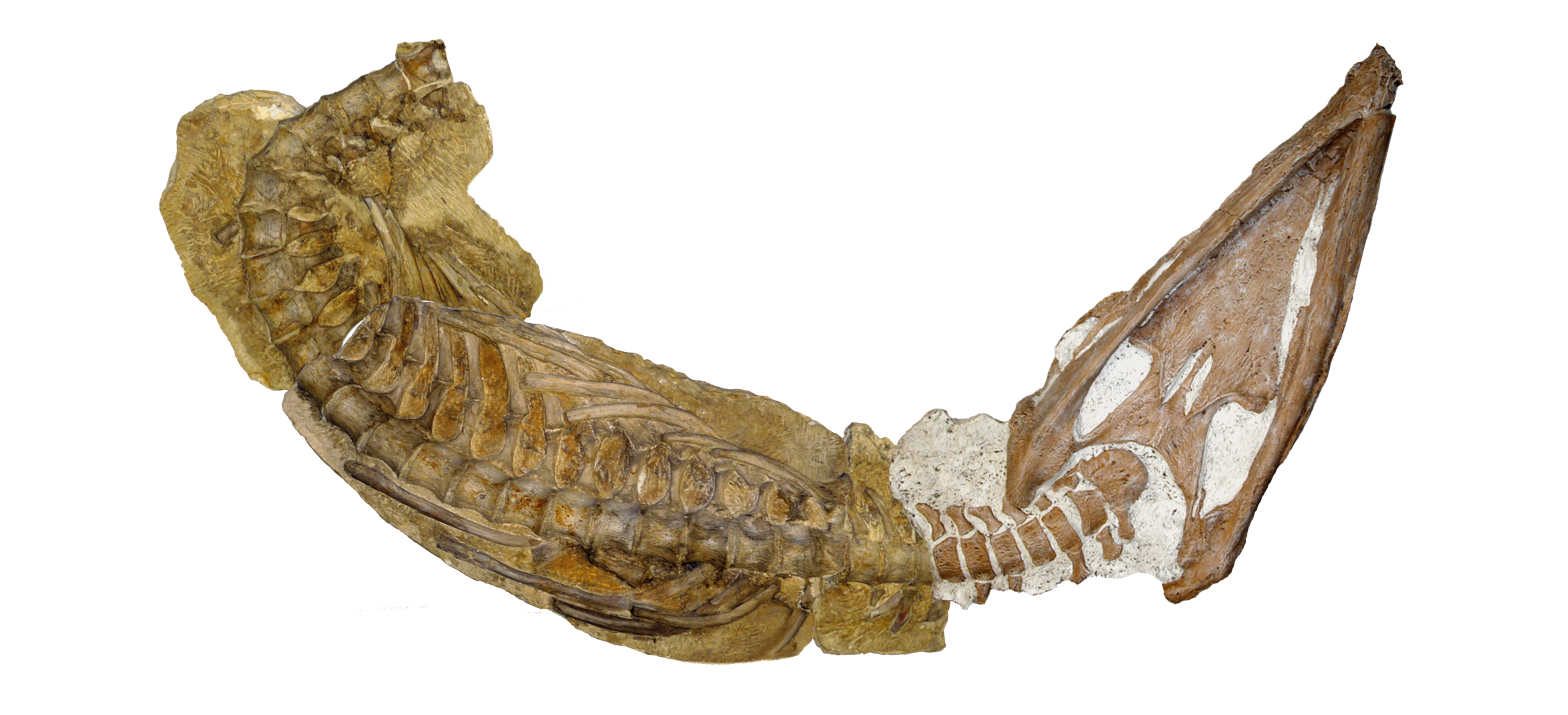
Skeleton of Brachauchenius, the type genus of the subfamily Brachaucheninae, a lineage of which Kronosaurus is a member

The exact phylogenetic positioning of Kronosaurus within the Pliosauridae has also been debated. In 1992, Hampe proposed to classify Kronosaurus with its close relative Brachauchenius in the proposed family Brachaucheniidae. Kenneth Carpenter agreed with Hampe in 1996, although noting some notable cranial differences between the two genera. (Note: The skulls used in Carpenter's study for comparison with those of Brachauchenius are the two specimens today attributed to Eiectus. In addition, one of the specimens attributed to Brachauchenius in his study has since 2013 been seen as the holotype of the distinct but closely related genus Megacephalosaurus.) The family Brachaucheniidae was originally erected in 1925 by Samuel Wendell Williston to include only Brachauchenius. In 2001, F. Robin O'Keefe revised the classification of Pliosauridae and classified Kronosaurus as a basal representative distantly related to Brachauchenius. In 2008, two studies and a thesis proposed alternative classifications for Kronosaurus. Patrick S. Druckenmiller and Anthony P. Russell classified Kronosaurus as a derived pliosaurid, Hilary F. Ketchum still classifying it as a sister taxon of Brachauchenius in this family. Adam S. Smith and Gareth J. Dyke reclassify both genera within the Brachaucheniidae, but the family is seen as the sister taxon of the Pliosauridae. McHenry suggests that if Ketchum's proposal is proved as valid, then it would be preferable to relegate Brachaucheniidae as a subfamily of the Pliosauridae, therefore being renamed Brachaucheninae. McHenry nevertheless maintains the name Brachaucheniidae in his thesis detailing in more detail Kronosaurus pending further phylogenetic results. In 2013, Roger B. S. Benson and Druckenmiller named a new clade within Pliosauridae, Thalassophonea. This clade included the "classic", short-necked pliosaurids while excluding the earlier, long-necked, more gracile forms. The authors thus move the family Brachaucheniidae as a subfamily, renaming it Brachaucheninae, and classify many Cretaceous pliosaurids there, including Kronosaurus. Within this subfamily, Kronosaurus appears to be one of the most derived representatives, being generally placed in a clade including Brachauchenius and more recently Megacephalosaurus. Subsequent studies have uncovered a similar position for Kronosaurus.

The cladogram below is modified from Madzia et al. (2018):

- Thalassophonea
  - Peloneustes philarchus
  - - 'Pliosaurus' andrewsi
    - - Simolestes vorax
      - - Liopleurodon ferox
        - - Pliosaurus patagonicus
          - Pliosaurus almanzaensis
          - 'Pliosaurus' irgisensis
          - Pliosaurus rossicus
          - Gallardosaurus iturraldei
          - - Pliosaurus brachyspondylus
            - Pliosaurus macromerus
            - Pliosaurus brachydeirus
            - Pliosaurus westburyensis
            - - - Pliosaurus kevani
                - Pliosaurus cf. kevani
              - - Pliosaurus carpenteri
                - Pliosaurus funkei
          - Brachaucheninae
            - Makhaira rossica
            - - Luskhan itilensis
              - - Stenorhynchosaurus munozi
                - - cf. Kronosaurus queenslandicus (QM F51291)
                  - Kronosaurus queenslandicus
                  - - Megacephalosaurus eulerti
                    - 'Polyptychodon interruptus' (DORK/G/1-2)
                    - - cf. Brachauchenius lucasi (MNA V9433)
                      - Brachauchenius lucasi

The Brachaucheninae subfamily brings together the majority of pliosaurids dating from the Cretaceous, with phylogenetic analyzes often uniting them within this clade. However, it is possible that this is not the only lineage of thalassophoneans to have survived after the Jurassic. Indeed, Lower Cretaceous pliosaur teeth, displaying characteristics distinct from the Brachaucheninae, suggest that at least one other lineage crossed the Jurassic-Cretaceous boundary. Members of the Brachaucheninae are variable and only one uniting characteristic between all is known; the possession of somewhat circularly-shaped teeth rather than full or somewhat trihedral-shaped teeth seen in some Jurassic pliosaurs. Some characteristics that are shared by most brachauchenines like Megacephalosaurus includes skull features (such as an elongated snout, gracile rostrum, and consistently sized teeth) that are better adapted for a general evolutionary shift towards smaller prey. However, there are notable exceptions such as Kronosaurus, which has teeth that are each shaped differently. Kronosaurus is one of the few representatives of this group who not share any of these traits, having differently shaped teeth. This type of dentition therefore indicates that Kronosaurus was a genus specialized in hunting large prey, unlike most other representatives of this group.

== Paleobiology ==
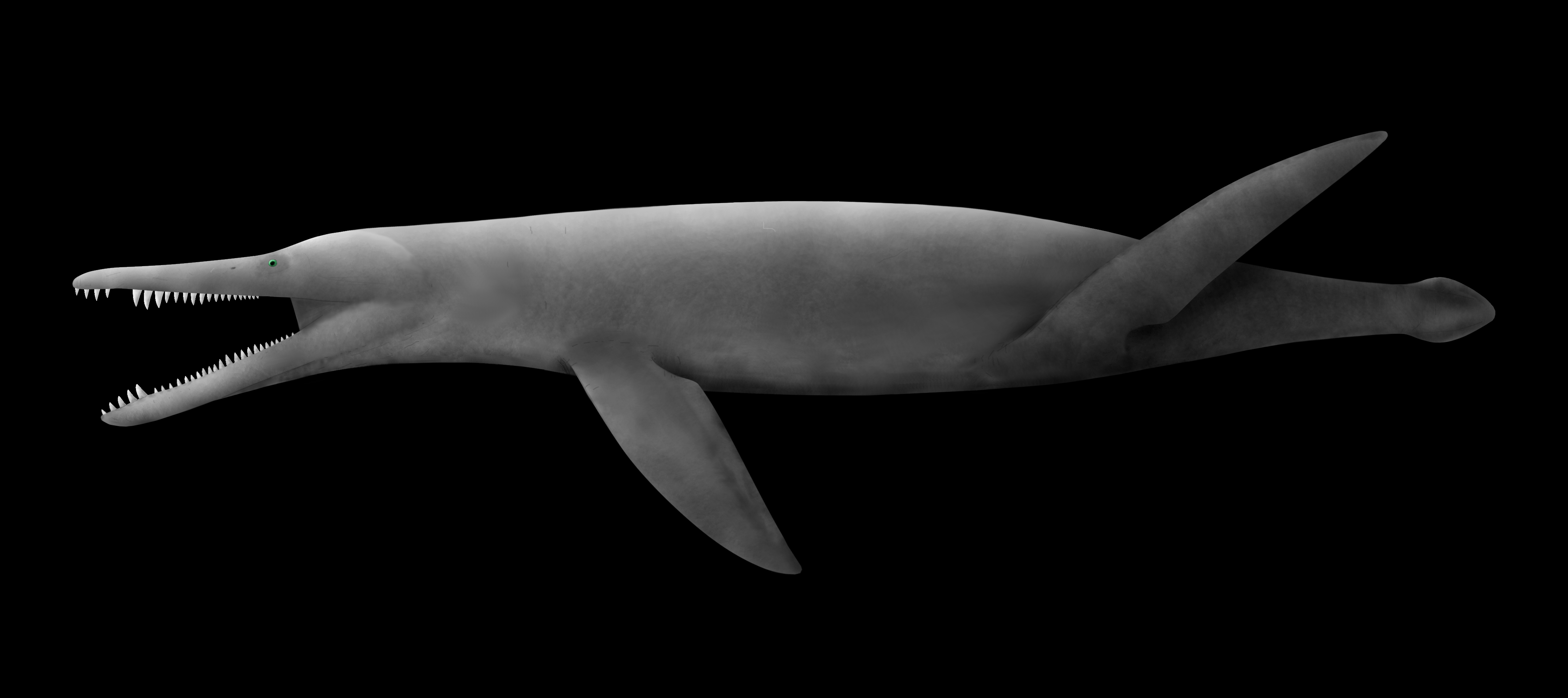
Life restoration based on the Harvard specimen

Plesiosaurs were well-adapted to marine life. They grew at rates comparable to those of birds and had high metabolisms, indicating homeothermy or even endothermy. The possibility of endothermy is also very probable in plesiosaurs that lived in Australia, including Kronosaurus, the southernmost areas having had particularly cold temperatures. A 2019 study by palaeontologist Corinna Fleischle and colleagues found that plesiosaurs had enlarged red blood cells, based on the morphology of their vascular canals, which would have aided them while diving. The short tail, while unlikely to have been used to propel the animal, could have helped stabilise or steer the plesiosaur.

=== Feeding ===
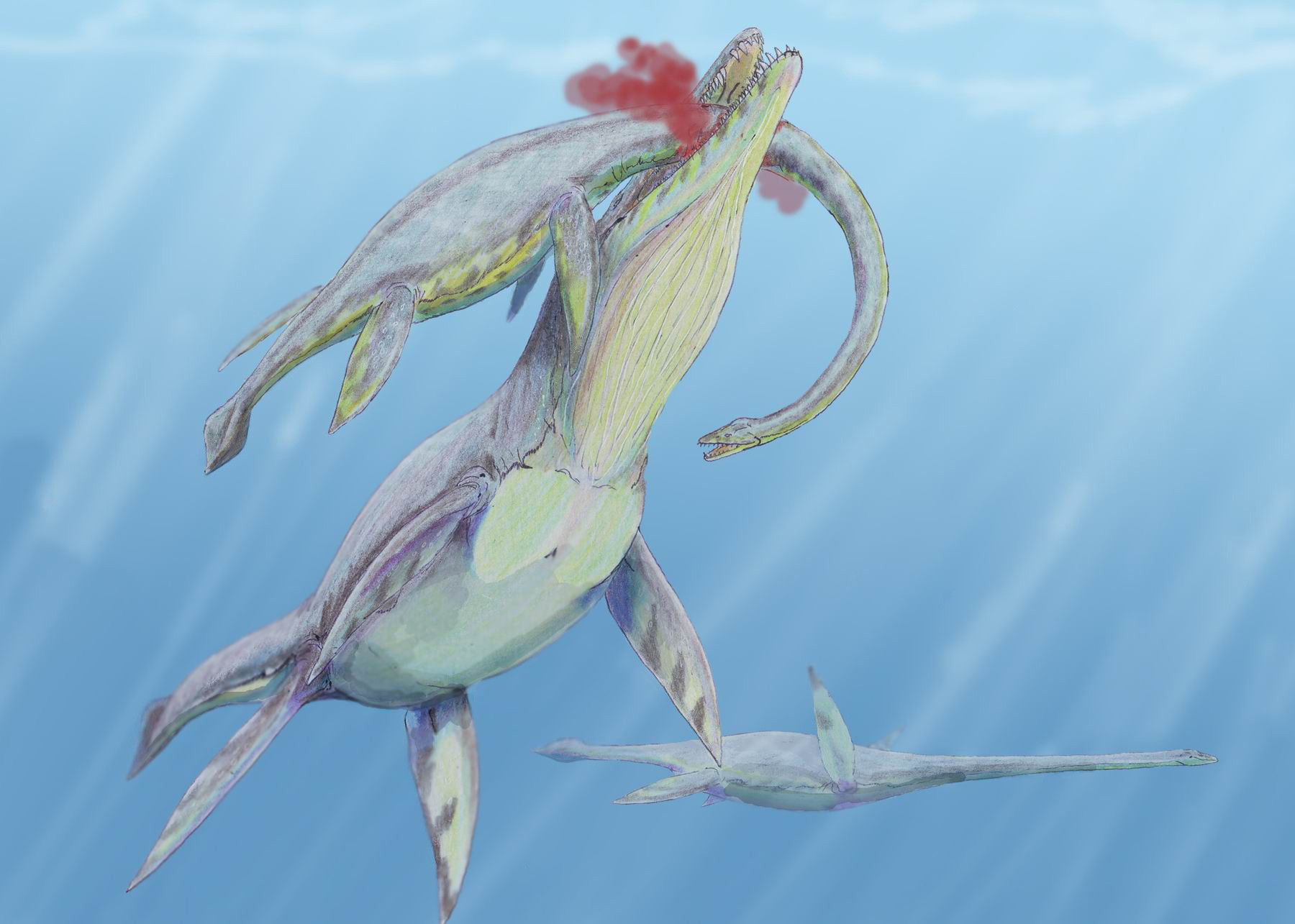
Restoration of Kronosaurus devouring a Woolungasaurus

Due to its imposing size, morphology and distribution, Kronosaurus would most likely have been the apex predator of the ancient Eromanga inland sea. Stomach contents have been found in some Kronosaurus specimens. The most notable of these is specimen QM F10113, the most complete known, which contains the remains of a sea turtle. The position of the turtle at the skeletal level indicates that the specimen died of suffocation after swallowing its prey. The fossil remains are too fragmentary to determine what genus this turtle belongs to, but its measurements are similar to the protostegid Notochelone, which is the most widespread sea turtle of the Albian strata of Queensland. In 1993, Tony Thulborn and Susan Turner analyzed the severely crushed skull of an elasmosaurid, which is today recognized as belonging to Eromangasaurus. In their study, the authors discovered the presence of multiple bite marks made by large teeth. These same traces correspond to the dentition of the specimens referred to its contemporary Kronosaurus, proving its predation towards this animal. This is also the first reported evidence of a pliosaur attack on an elasmosaurid. Elasmosaurids having a very elongated neck and a small head, the injuries found in Eromangasaurus suggest that Kronosaurus would have regularly attacked this region of the body. Although no direct fossil evidence of feeding is known, the animal would likely also have preyed on leptocleidids.

=== Intraspecific combat ===
The smallest specimen attributed to Kronosaurus, cataloged as QM F51291, shows bite marks on its skull. In his 2009 thesis, McHenry highlights that the maximum possible size of Kronosaurus is 10.5 meters (34 ft), and suggests that the three known specimens not reaching the minimum size of 7 meters (23 ft) represent juveniles or subadults. After analysis, he therefore suggests that this specimen would have been a juvenile which would have been fatally killed by the bite of an adult, indicating an intraspecific aggression or even cannibalism in Kronosaurus. He supports this hypothesis on the basis of common observations of many adult crocodilians not hesitating to attack juveniles. However, McHenry suggests that it is also possible that the bites would have been made shortly after the specimen died of another cause.

=== Bite force ===
A large part of McHenry's 2009 thesis is dedicated to the bite force of Kronosaurus using biomechanical analyses. Using these techniques, McHenry discovered that Kronosaurus exceeded the bite force of any living animal, itself being only slightly surpassed in some estimates by the well-known theropod dinosaur Tyrannosaurus. Based on specimen QM F10113, the bite force of Kronosaurus is estimated to be between 16,000 to 23,000 newtons (3,600 to 5,170 lbf). Still based on the same specimen, a 2014 Foffa et al. (2014) reestimates the bite force at between 15,000 to 27,000 newtons (3,370 to 6,070 lbf), corresponding to its close Jurassic relative Pliosaurus kevani. The estimates of this study regarding the bite force of these two pliosaurids exceed that of the predatory placoderm fish Dunkleosteus but are far from equaling that of the megalodon, to which the latter would have reached between 93,000 to 182,000 newtons (20,910 to 40,920 lbf).

== Paleoecology ==
=== Contemporaneous biota ===
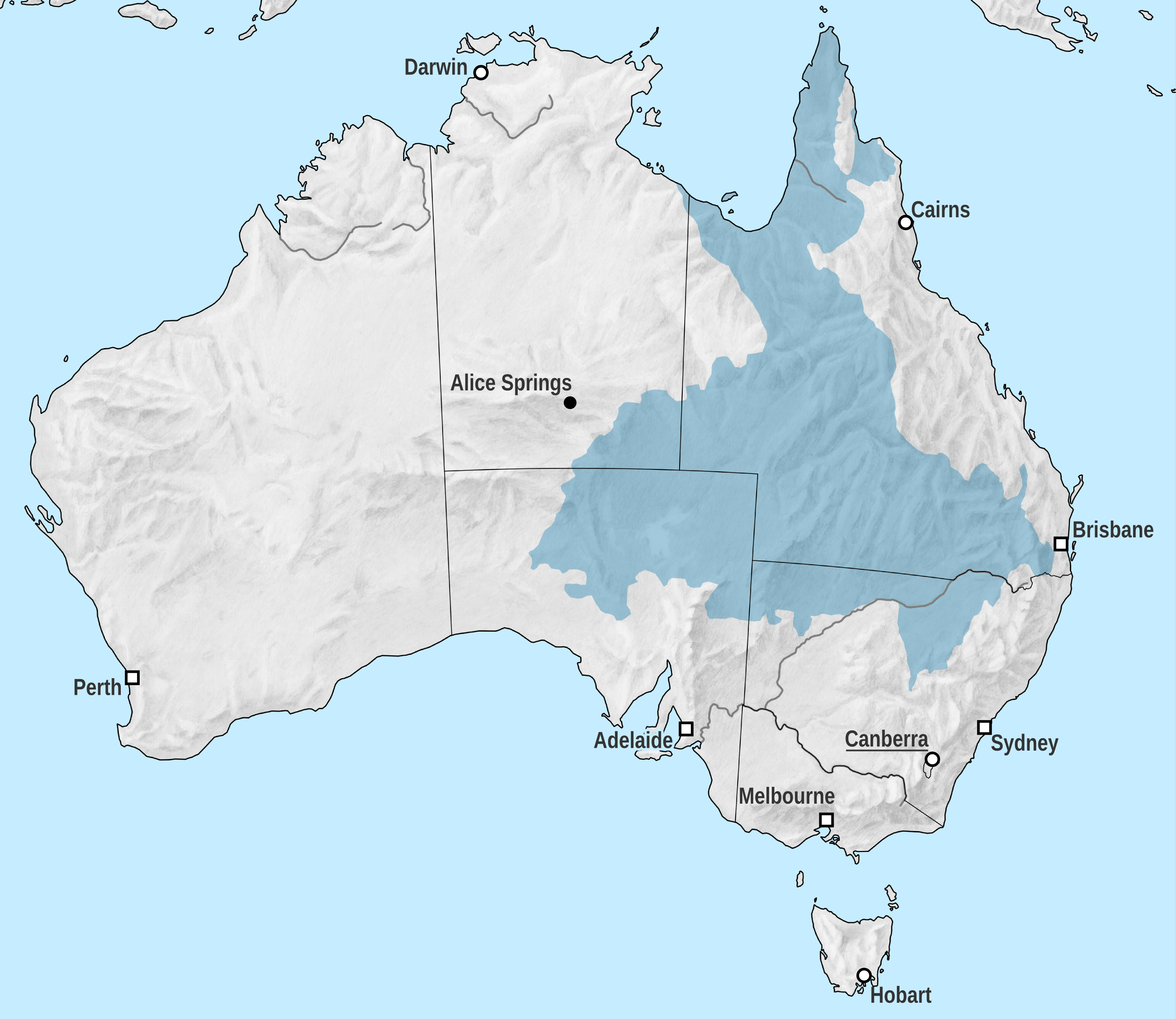
Map of the Great Artesian Basin, which is seen as the remnant of the ancient inland sea of Eromanga

All the geological formations from which fossils attributed to Kronosaurus have been discovered are located in the Great Artesian Basin (GAB). During the Lower Cretaceous, this geographical area was flooded by an inland sea known as the Eromanga Sea. The sedimentary record shows that this sea was relatively shallow, muddy and stagnant. Temperatures in this sea would have been particularly cold, approaching near freezing, and seasonal ice may have formed in some areas. Sea temperatures during the Albian would nevertheless have been warmer than during the Aptian.

Many invertebrates are known from the fossil record dating from the Late Aptian to Late Albian of the GAB, mainly represented by molluscs. Free-swimming organisms include cephalopods, which include many ammonites, belemnites, and squids. Benthic zones are mainly dominated by bivalves, with gastropods and scaphopods being less diverse. Other types of invertebrates are known, such as crinoid echinoderms, decapod crustaceans, brachiopods, polychaete annelids and one species of glass sponge. The diversification of fish within the Eromanga Sea seems to vary according to geological periods, since they are not very present in the Albian strata but are abundant in the Aptian archives, particularly in the Upper Aptian. These include actinopterygians such as Australopachycormus, Richmondichthys Flindersichthys, Cooyoo and Pachyrhizondontus. The only known sarcopterygians are the lungfish Ceratodus and Neoceratodus. Chondrichthyans are also present, represented by Archaeolamna, Carcharias, Cretolamna, Cretoxyrhina, Edaphodon, Echinorhinus, Leptostyrax, Microcorax, Notorynchus, Pseudocorax, Pristiophorus, Scapanorhynchus and several species of orectolobiforms and palaeospinacids. These fish include surface-dwelling, midwater, and benthic varieties of various sizes, some of which could get quite large. They filled a variety of niches, including invertebrate eaters, piscivores, and, in the case of Cretoxyrhina, large apex predators.

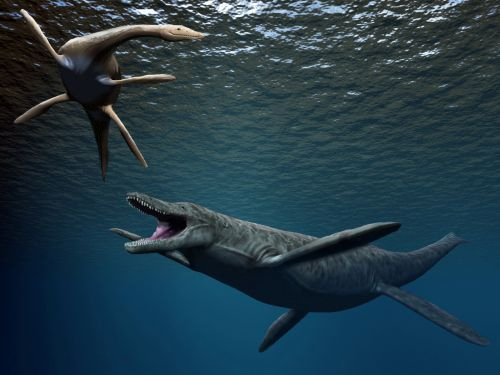
Life restoration of a Kronosaurus hunting a plesiosauroid

The Eromanga Sea is known for its great diversification of marine reptiles. Identified marine turtles include the protostegids Cratochelone, Bouliachelys and Notochelone, this latter being the most diverse within the inland sea. Several ichthyosaur fossils have been discovered in Queensland and were historically assigned to several different genera. We now know that these fossils probably belong to the species Platypterygius australis, (Note: Most authors refer to the taxon as Platypterygius longmani, name which has been seen as a junior synonym of P. australis since 2010.) which is one of the youngest ichthyosaurs known in the fossil record. Other fossils attributable to this species have been discovered in other formations of the GAB, notably in the Bulldog Shale, but they prove to be too fragmentary to determine a clear diagnostic. Several plesiosaurians have been identified, but most fossils are either too fragmentary or non-diagnostic for them to be assigned to a specific genus or species. Kronosaurus is stratigraphically the most widespread plesiosaurian in Australia, and would be the only large representative of a pliosaurid known to date in the country, if we exclude the proposed genus Eiectus. The only known cryptoclidid is Opallionectes. Elasmosaurids include Eromangasaurus and numerous interminate representatives. Some representatives of the Leptocleidia clade, which includes Leptocleididae and Polycotylidae, are known. Leptocleids include Leptocleidus, Umoonasaurus, and a few specimens with undetermined attributions. Polycotylids are only known from undetermined or not yet described specimens, the most notable of them the Richmond specimen.

Some archosaurs from various groups have also been identified in the fossil record of the Eromanga Sea. Numerous fragmentary remains of dinosaurs from specimens that probably perished after drowning in the waters of Eromanga are known, these being identified as coming from the sauropod Austrosaurus, the ankylosaurian Minmi and the ornithopod Muttaburrasaurus. In addition to dinosaurs, many pterosaur fossils are known, and these could have been predators comparable to many modern-day seabirds. However, theirs fossils are often fragmentary, and few taxa have been named. Among the erected genera, there are Aussiedraco, Haliskia, Mythunga and Thapunngaka.

=== Interspecific competition ===
Despite its status as an apex predator, Kronosaurus was sometimes attacked by other contemporary predators. Indeed, a mandible cataloged as KK F0630, possibly representing a large subadult or a small adult specimen, shows bite marks which would have been made by lamniform sharks belonging to the Cretoxyrhinidae family. Injuries of this type are not unlikely, as several sharks attributed to this family have been identified in various geological formations where Kronosaurus is known. The grooves showing the bite marks being surrounded by aberrant raised osseous growth indicate that the specimen would have healed during its lifetime.

== See also ==
- List of plesiosaur genera
- Timeline of plesiosaur research
