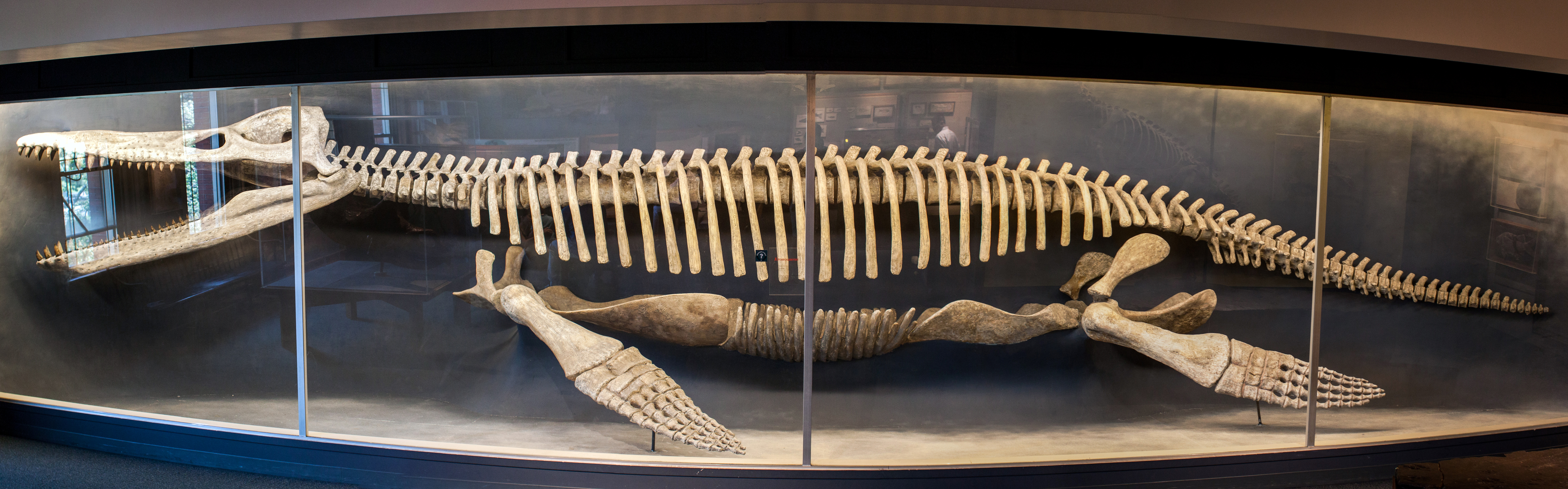
- Specimen MCZ 1285, which may have been reconstructed with too many vertebrae

Scientific classification
- Kingdom: Animalia
- Phylum: Chordata
- Class: Reptilia
- Order: †Plesiosauria
- Family: †Pliosauridae
- Genus: †Eiectus Noè & Gómez-Pérez, 2021

Binomial name
- †Eiectus longmani Noè & Gómez-Pérez, 2021

= Eiectus =

Eiectus Temporal range: Early Cretaceous, Albian

Extinct genus of pliosaur

Eiectus is a potentially valid genus of extinct short-necked pliosaur that lived in the Early Cretaceous period. Fossil material has been recovered from the Wallumbilla Formation (Aptian) of Queensland was initially classified under the related genus Kronosaurus until 2021.

== History ==
=== Initial discoveries ===
A partial skull previously assigned to Kronosaurus queenslandicus that was discovered in 1929 in the same place as the holotype of K. queenslandicus probably belonged to Eiectus, and another skull discovered in 1935 near Telemon Station in Hughenden, Queensland and prepared in May 1936 may have also belonged to Eiectus, along with all other Albian remains previously referred to K. queenslandicus.

=== MCZ 1285: the Harvard specimen ===
In 1931 the Harvard Museum of Comparative Zoology (MCZ) sent an expedition to Australia for the dual purpose of procuring specimens – the museum being "weak in Australian animals and...desires[ing] to complete its series" – and to engage in "the study of the animals of the region when alive." The Harvard Australian Expedition (1931–1932), as it became known, was a six-man venture led by Harvard Professor William Morton Wheeler, with the others being Dr. P. Jackson Darlington Jr. (a renowned coleopterist), Dr. Glover Morrill Allen and his student Ralph Nicholson Ellis, medical officer Dr. Ira M. Dixon, and William E. Schevill (a graduate-student in his twenties and Associate Curator of Invertebrate Palaeontology). MCZ director Thomas Barbour said at the time "We shall hope for specimens' of the kangaroo, the wombat, the Tasmanian devil and Tasmanian wolf," and the mission was a success with over 300 mammal and thousands of insect specimens returning to the United States. Yet Mr. Schevill, the team's fossil enthusiast, remained in Australia after the others had departed and, in the winter of 1932, was told by the rancher R.W.H. Thomas of rocks with something "odd" poking out of them on his property near Hughenden. The rocks were limestone nodules containing the most complete skeleton of Kronosaurus ever discovered. After dynamiting the nodules out of the ground (and into smaller pieces weighing approximately four tons) with the aid of a British migrant trained in the use of explosives, William Schevill had the fossils shipped back to Harvard for examination and preparation. The skull—which matched the holotype jaw fragment of K. queenslandicus—was prepared right away, but time and budget constraints put off restoration of the nearly complete skeleton – most of the bones of which remained unexcavated within the limestone blocks – for 20 years.

Scale diagram, showing the size of the restored Harvard Eiectus skeleton along with a more accurate estimate

This interim ended when they came to the attention of Godfrey Lowell Cabot – Boston industrialist, philanthropist, and founder of the Cabot Corporation – "who was then in his nineties" and "had been interested in sea serpents since childhood." Having formerly questioned MCZ director Alfred Romer about the existence and reports of sea serpents, it thus occurred to Dr. Romer to tell Mr. Cabot about the skeleton in the museum closet. Godfrey Cabot thus asked how much a restoration would cost and "Romer, pulling a figure out of the musty air, replied, 'Oh, about $10,000.'" Romer may not have been serious but the philanthropist clearly was because the check for said sum came shortly thereafter. Two years – and more than $10,000 – later, following the careful labor of the museum preparators, the restored and mounted skeleton was displayed at Harvard in 1959. However, Dr. Romer and MCZ preparator Arnold Lewis confirmed that same year in the institution's journal Breviora that "erosion had destroyed a fair fraction of this once complete and articulated skeleton...so that approximately a third of the specimen as exhibited is plaster restoration." Furthermore, the original (real) bones are also layered in plaster; a fact that, while keeping the fossils safe, makes it difficult for paleontologists to study it – an issue which factors into the controversial question of the true size of the Kronosaurus queenslandicus.

Welles (1962) suggested that MCZ 1285 should be the neotype of what would later become Eiectus. Molnar (1982a, 1991) suggested that MCZ 1285 may not be conspecific with the holotype of Kronosaurus queenslandicus, but instead believing that it represents a second species or a new genus that differs in having a deeper and more robust skull (followed by Thulborn and Turner, 1993).

=== 2021 revision of Kronosaurus ===
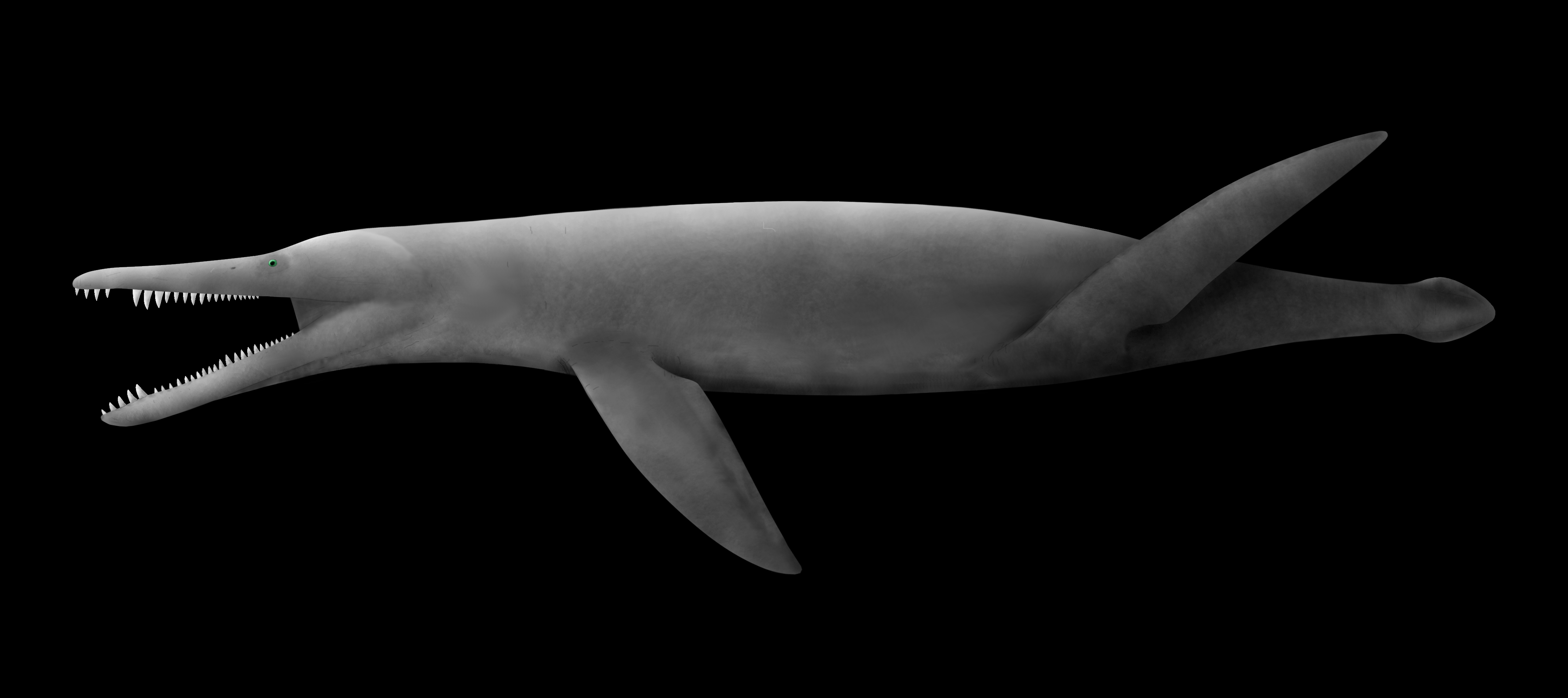
Life restoration based on the Harvard specimen

In 2021, a revision of K. boyacensis also transferred most of the remains of K. queenslandicus, including the Harvard remains, to a new genus and species, Eiectus longmani. The revision limits the genus Kronosaurus to the holotype mandible, and treats it as a nomen dubium. Fischer et al. (2023) criticized the reassignments even under these circumstances, predicting that they stand contrary to ICZN Articles 75.5 and 75.6 (which codifies preference for neotype designation for previously iconic taxa with non-diagnostic holotypes) and that the aforementioned multiple-species possibility cannot justify a tentative reassignment of all specimens to Eiectus. The authors instead opted to refer to all relevant fossils as Kronosaurus-Eiectus. A 2023 review of Australian fossil tetrapods restricted the name Eiectus to specimens MCZ 1285 and MCZ 1284.
