= William E. Schevill =

American paleontologist

- Born: July 2, 1906; Brooklyn, New York
- Died: July 25, 1994 (aged 88); Emerson Hospital, Concord, Massachusetts
- Education: Harvard College
- Occupations: Paleontologist, Cetologist
- Spouse: Barbara Lawrence
- Children: Lee Schevill (daughter), Edward Schevill (son)

William Edward "Bill" Schevill (July 2, 1906 – July 25, 1994) was an American paleontologist famous for his part in dynamiting out the nodules of the most complete skeleton of the short-necked pliosaur Kronosaurus queenslandicus discovered in Hughenden in Queensland, Australia, in 1932. He later became known as an authority on the sounds of whales. Schevill had the title of scientist emeritus at the Woods Hole Oceanographic Institution, where he had begun working in 1943, technically retiring in 1985.

== Early Education ==
Born July 2, 1906 in Brooklyn, New York, William E. Schevill grew up in Manhattan, New York, and St Louis, Missouri. Prior to going to college he spent nearly a year in Silver City, New Mexico where, working a ranch, he earned the rank of wrangler. Graduating from Harvard College in 1927, he saw the rejuvenation of the Harvard Museum of Comparative Zoology (MCZ) as initiated by the new director Thomas Barbour and, in 1929 Bill Schevill earned an A.M. with and was made the assistant of Percy Raymond, MCZ Professor and Curator of Invertebrate Palaeontology. Soon promoted to Associate Curator, Schevill traveled with Professor Raymond on "significant fossil-collecting expeditions to the Burgess Shale, British Columbia (1930) and to Estonia, Norway and Sweden (1934)."

=== Kronosaurus discovery ===
In 1931 the (MCZ) sent an expedition to Australia for the dual purpose of procuring specimens - the museum being "weak in Australian animals and...desires[ing] to complete its series" - and to engage in "the study of the animals of the region when alive." The Harvard Australian Expedition (1931–1932), as it became known, was a six-man venture led by Harvard Professor William Morton Wheeler, with the others being P. Jackson Darlington, Jr. (a renowned coleopterist), Glover Morrill Allen and his student Ralph Nicholson Ellis, medical officer Ira M. Dixon, and William E. Schevill. MCZ director Thomas Barbour said at the time "We shall hope for specimens' of the kangaroo, the wombat, the Tasmanian devil and Tasmanian wolf," and the mission was a success with over a hundred mammals and thousands of insect specimens returning to the United States. Yet Mr. Schevill, the team's fossil enthusiast, remained in Australia after the others had departed and, in the winter of 1932, was told by the rancher R.W.H. Thomas of rocks with something "odd" poking out of them on his property near Hughenden. The rocks were limestone nodules containing the most complete skeleton of a Kronosaurus ever discovered. After dynamiting the nodules out of the ground (and into smaller pieces weighing approximately four tons) with the aid of a British migrant trained in the use of explosives, Scheville had the fossils shipped back to Harvard for examination and preparation. The skull—which matched the holotype jaw fragment of K. queenslandicus—was prepared right away, but time and budget constraints put off restoration of the nearly complete skeleton - most of the bones of which remained unexcavated within the limestone blocks - for 20 years.

Following his return from the expedition, William E. Schevill was made a librarian of the MCZ from 1935 to 1943, "and Barbour noted in 1937 that he had 'a decided taste for bibliography'." Unsurprisingly, Mr. Schevill became a founding member of the Society for the Bibliography of Natural History in 1936. During this period he earned a master's degree in paleontology from Harvard, and met his future wife, Vassar College student Barbara Lawrence. They married December 23, 1938, and had two children: a daughter named Lee, and a son named Edward.

== Cetology ==
After he became an Associate in Physical Oceanography at Woods Hole Oceanographic Institution (WHOI) in Massachusetts in 1943, Bill Schevill's first work was under US Naval auspices investigating echolocation of U-boats. Indeed, he had been rejected for military service because of chronic iritis, but he joined a small group that worked with Allied submariners on monitoring the temperature of the ocean's upper levels so as to exploit it for stealth when dealing with enemy sonar. As he later wrote in 1962: "During World War II many people on both sides listened to underwater sounds for military reasons. Not only the wanted sounds (those made by enemy ships), but a bewildering variety of others were heard. Most of these were ascribed to animals living in the sea, usually as 'fish noises' ... Some were ascribed to whales, in part correctly, but without identification of the kind of whale; most military listeners were not biologists, and in any case the traditional naval sonar room is woefully deficient in windows." Such maritime work inspired him and, leaving palaeontology behind, led William E. Schevill to become "one of the world's most innovative whale biologists and an undisputed pioneer in the field of whale sounds," producing the first recordings of underwater whale sounds and extrapolating their purpose from these recordings. His groundbreaking work produced over fifty papers on whale phonation and thus provided the framework for “literally hundreds of scientific studies produced by other workers from the 1960s until the present day." However, it is worthy of note that his wife Barbara Lawrence, by now the MCZ's Curator of Mammals, often co-wrote these documents with him. However, in spite of his change in field, it is reported that Bill Schevill split his time equally between the MCZ and the WHOI - his work with the latter likely relating to Cetology as opposed to fossil studies.

William E. Schevill's study of whales also at one point harked back to the U.S. Naval operations that first set him down this path. As noted upon his death by the Society for the Bibliography of Natural History, "Bill helped defuse a tense moment between the USA and Soviet Union during the Cold War. The US military suspected that low frequency blips were being used by the Soviets to locate American submarines, whereas Bill showed these were produced by fin whales (Balaenoptera physalus) hunting prey."

William E. Schevill technically retired in 1985, though he continued to work unofficially even after, and died of pneumonia Monday July 25, 1994 at Emerson Hospital in Concord, Mass, where he lived; survived by his wife, daughter, and son.

== Honors ==
Schevill is commemorated in the scientific name of a species of Australian lizard, Ctenotus schevilli, the holotype of which he collected in 1932.
