= Inland sea =

Body of water located within a landmasss

An inland sea, also known as an epeiric sea or an epicontinental sea, is a very large body of water located within a landmass. It may be completely surrounded by dry land (landlocked) or connected to the World Ocean by a narrow river, strait, or "arm of the sea". An inland sea will generally be brackish, with higher salinity than a fresh water lake but usually lower salinity than seawater. As with other seas, inland seas experience tides governed by the orbits of the Moon and the Sun.

== Definition ==
What constitutes an "inland sea" is complex and somewhat necessarily vague. The United States Hydrographic Office defined it as "a body of water nearly or completely surrounded by land, especially if very large or composed of salt water".

Geologic engineers Heinrich Ries and Thomas L. Watson say an inland sea is merely a very large lake. Rydén, Migula, and Andersson and Deborah Sandler of the Environmental Law Institute add that an inland sea is "more or less" cut off from the ocean. It may be semi-enclosed, or connected to the ocean by a strait or "arm of the sea". An inland sea is distinguishable from a bay in that a bay is directly connected to the ocean.

The term "epeiric sea" was coined by Joseph Barrell in 1917. He defined an epeiric sea as a shallow body of water whose bottom is within the wave base (e.g., where bottom sediments are no longer stirred by the wave above), as one with limited connection to an ocean, and as simply shallow. (Note: Geologist Richard A. Matzner defines shallow as usually under 250 metres (820 ft) in depth. Rydén, Migula, and Andersson do not define shallow, but cite examples of inland seas with a depth of 100 metres (330 ft) or less.) An inland sea is only an epeiric sea when a continental interior is flooded by marine transgression due to sea level rise or epeirogenic movement.

An epicontinental sea is synonymous with an epeiric sea. The term "epicontinental sea" may also refer to the waters above a continental shelf. This is a legal, not geological, term. Epeiric, epicontinental, and inland seas occur on a continent, not adjacent to it.

The law of the sea does not apply to fully enclosed inland seas, such as the Caspian Sea.

== Modern inland seas ==
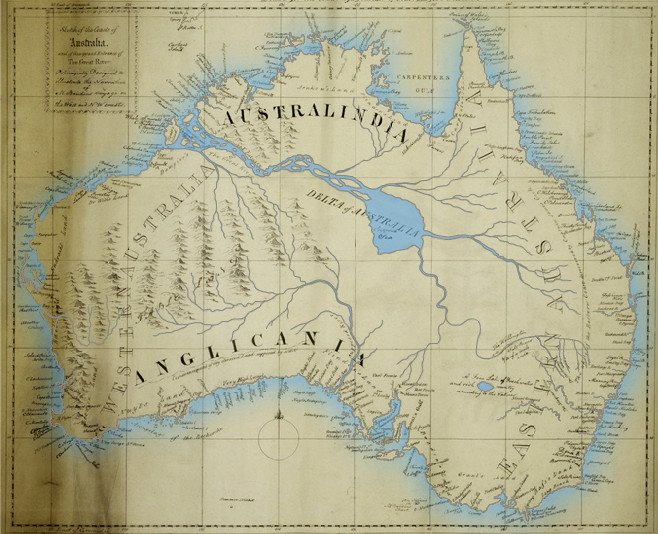
This 1827 map of Australia depicts a 'Great River' and a 'Supposed Sea' that both proved nonexistent.

In modern times, continents stand high, eustatic sea levels are low, and there are few inland seas:

- The Baltic Sea is a brackish inland sea, arguably the largest body of brackish water in the world. Other possibilities include the White Sea and the northern half of the Black Sea (its deep southern basin is a closed-off relic of the now-vanished Tethys Sea). The origin of the Baltic Sea basin is not clear as there are differing views on the role of erosion and tectonics.
- Hudson Bay, including James Bay at its southern end, reaches within the North American continent from Baffin Island, Nunavut in the north to Quebec, Ontario and Manitoba in the south. The bay shares some similarities with the Gulf of Bothnia in Fennoscandia; it lies in the middle of a shield and it was the centre of an ice sheet during the Quaternary glaciations. However, the origin of both depressions is unrelated to glacier erosion.
- The Sea of Marmara located in modern-day Turkey is surrounded by land all around, except where it connects the two Turkish Straits, the Bosporus and the Dardanelles.
- The Seto Inland Sea in Japan is not a true inland sea but rather a body of water separating Honshū, Kyushu, and Shikoku, three of the four main islands of Japan.

The Caspian Sea is a very large, inland body of water at least hundreds of miles from the nearest part of the World Ocean (such as the Persian Gulf) and has some characteristics of the sea, like being composed of at least a good portion of saltwater. However, it is also considered the largest lake in the world.

The Great Lakes, despite being completely fresh water, have been referred to as resembling or having characteristics like inland seas from a USGS management perspective.

Modern examples might also include the recently (less than 10,000 years ago) reflooded Persian Gulf, and the South China Sea that presently covers the Sunda Shelf. (Note: The Lord Howe Rise that covers much of the sunken "continent" of Zealandia and the largely submerged Mascarene Plateau that includes the Granitic Group islands of the Seychelles could not be considered "inland".)

== Former epicontinental seas in Earth's history ==
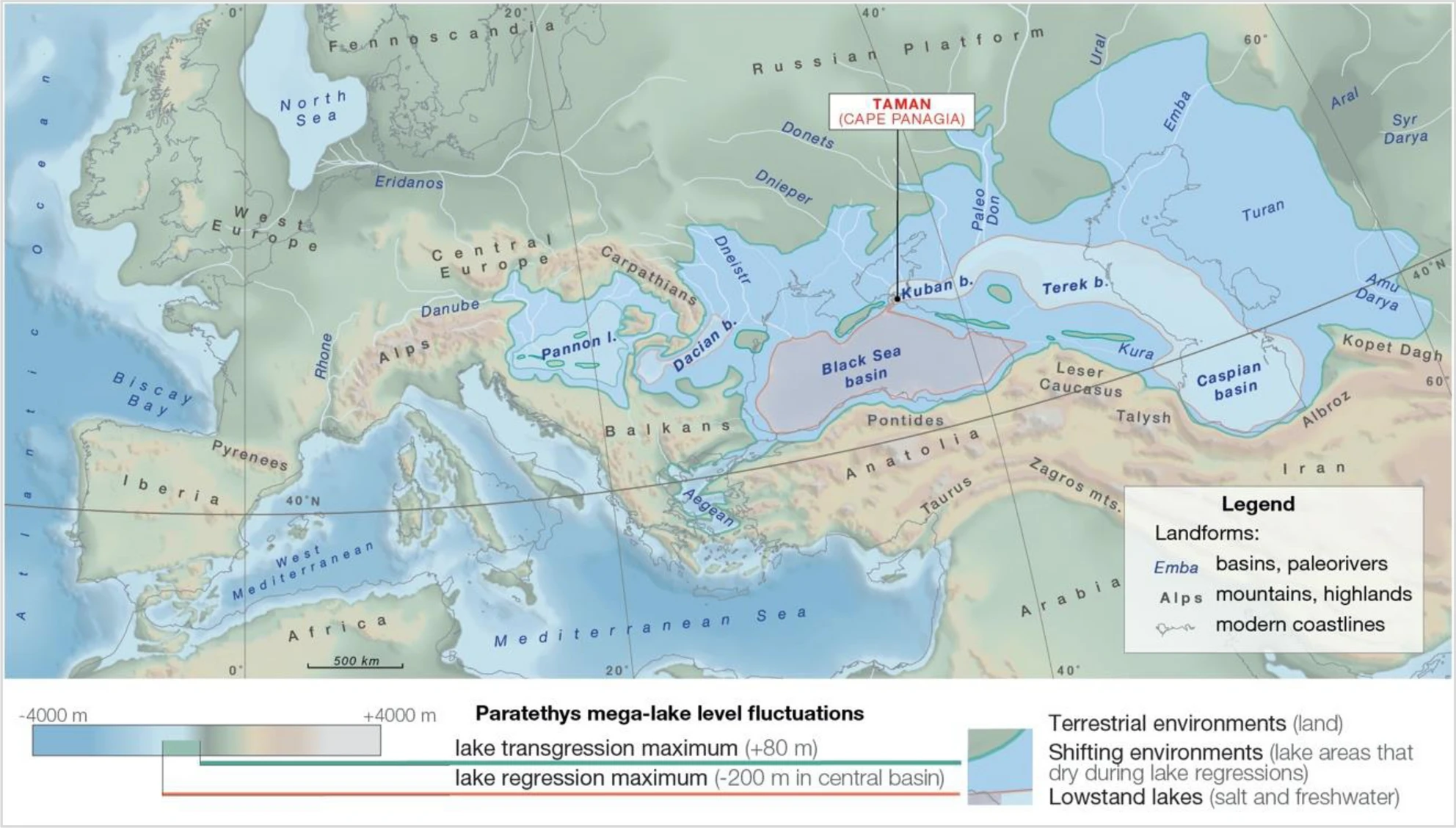
Map of the Paratethys during the Miocene

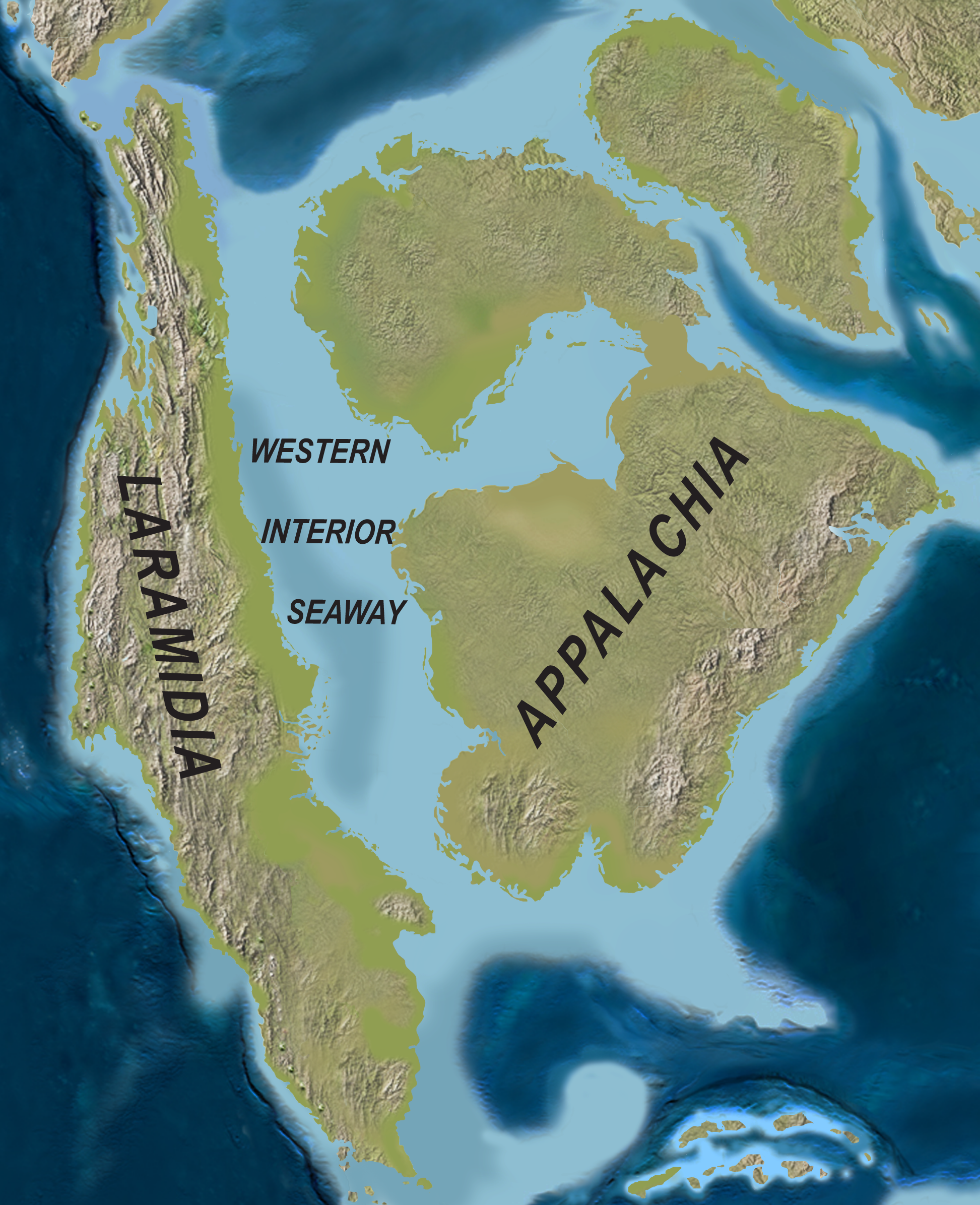
Map showing the Western Interior Seaway during the Late Cretaceous period

At various times in the geologic past, inland seas covered central areas of continents during periods of high sea level that result in marine transgressions. Inland seas have been greater in extent and more common than at present.

- During the Oligocene and Early Miocene large swaths of Patagonia were subject to a marine transgression. The transgression might have temporarily linked the Pacific and Atlantic oceans, as inferred from the findings of marine invertebrate fossils of both Atlantic and Pacific affinity in La Cascada Formation. Connection would have occurred through narrow epicontinental seaways that formed channels in a dissected topography.
- A vast inland sea, the Western Interior Seaway, extended from the Gulf of Mexico deep into present-day Canada during the Cretaceous.
- At the same time, much of the low plains of modern-day northern France and northern Germany were inundated by an inland sea, where the chalk was deposited that gave the Cretaceous Period its name.
- The Amazon, originally emptying into the Pacific, as South America rifted from Africa, found its exit blocked by the rise of the Andes about 15 million years ago. A great inland sea developed, at times draining north through what is now Venezuela before finding its present eastward outlet into the South Atlantic. Gradually this inland sea became a vast freshwater lake and wetlands where sediment flattened its profiles and the marine inhabitants adapted to life in freshwater. Over 20 species of stingray, most closely related to those found in the Pacific Ocean, can be found today in the freshwaters of the Amazon, which is also home to a freshwater dolphin. In 2005, fossilized remains of a giant crocodilian, estimated to have been 46 ft (14 m) in length, were discovered in the northern rainforest of Amazonian Peru.
- In Australia, the Eromanga Sea existed during the Cretaceous Period. It covered large swaths of the eastern half of the continent. (Note: Also in Australia the promise of an inland sea is often said to have been one of the prime motives of inland exploration during the 1820s and 1830s. Although this theory was championed by the explorer Charles Sturt, it enjoyed little support among the other explorers, most of whom were more inclined to believe in the existence of a Great River which discharged into the ocean in the north-west corner of the continent.)

== See also ==
- Endorheic basin – Closed drainage basin that has no outflow
- Marginal sea – A sea partially enclosed by islands, archipelagos, or peninsulas
- Mediterranean seas – Enclosed sea with limited water exchange
