= Eromanga Sea =

Cretaceous sea in Australia

Coordinates: 26°S 140°E

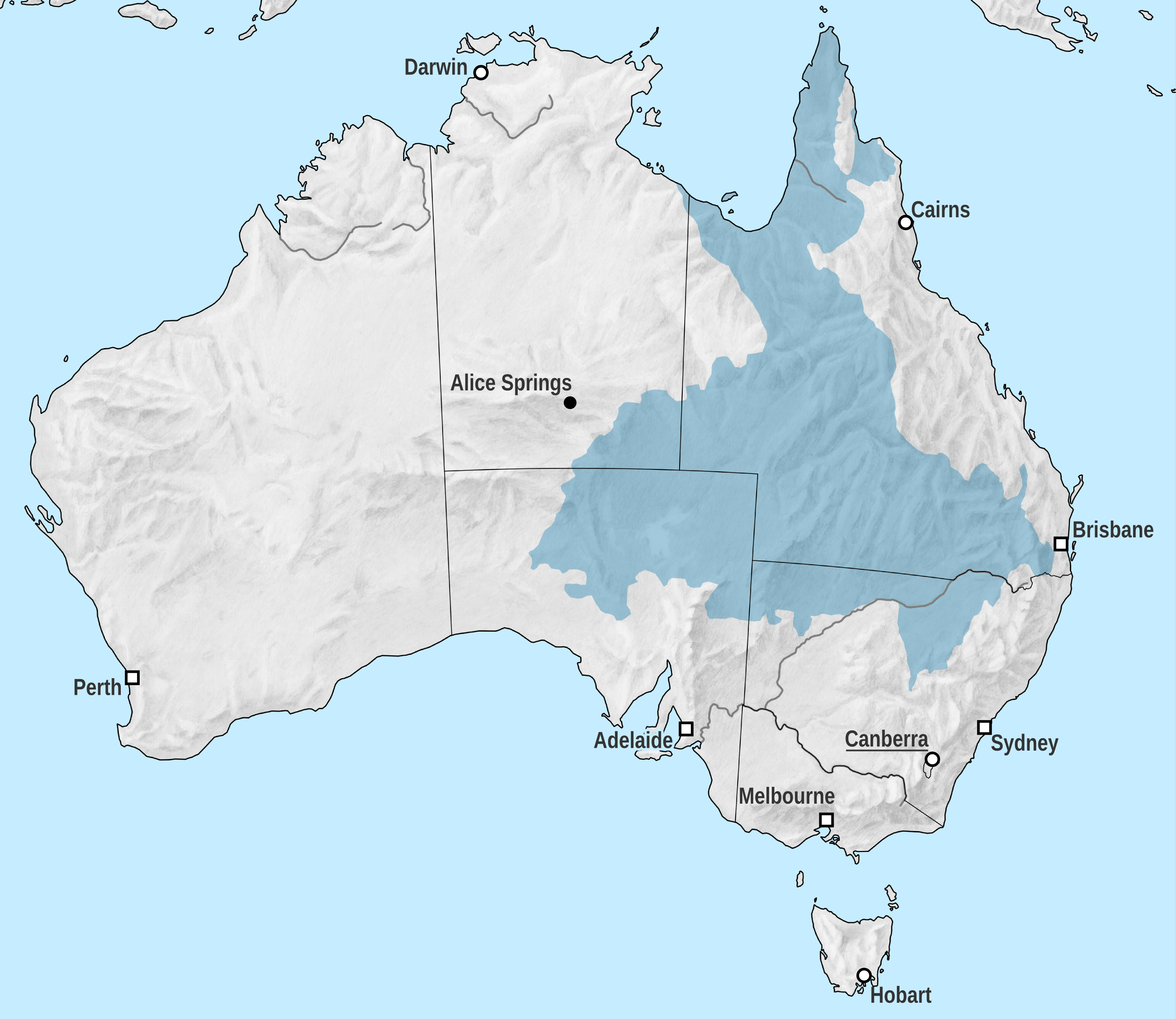
The Great Artesian Basin lies atop a layer of marine sandstone that formed the bottom of the inland Eromanga Sea.

The Eromanga Sea was an inland sea across the Australian continent that formed in the Early Cretaceous. The sea extended from the Eromanga Basin northward to the Carpentarian Basin. Its southern extents comprised lagoons and rivers, and to the east it reached Surat Basin, a bay.

The sea covered large parts of what is now Queensland and Central Australia at least four times during the early Cretaceous. The sea is named after Eromanga, Queensland. The present-day Winton Formation represents remnants of the river plains that filled the basin left by the Eromanga Sea. The formation is a major source of dinosaur fossils.

== Opals ==
The Great Artesian Basin (GAB) was flooded by the Eromanga Sea and filled with volcaniclastic sediments eroded from the Cordillera's volcanic arc. A theory was proposed explaining the abundance of opals in GAB. It was suggested that the Eromanga Sea was shallow, cold, muddy, and stagnant, which has led to little amount of carbonates in sediments in the Eromanga Basin. However the abundance of iron-rich and organic sediments has led to an anoxic sub-seafloor well-suited for anaerobic, pyrite-producing bacteria. It was suggested that during the periods of uplift, erosion, and denudation opals were formed due to acidic oxidative weathering during 97 to 60 Ma.
