= Harvard Australian Expedition (1931–1932) =

Scientific expedition

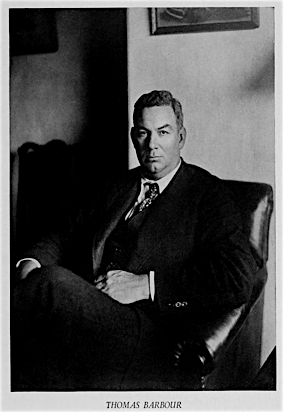
MCZ Director Thomas Barbour sent the expedition.

The Harvard Australian Expedition of 1931–1932 was a six-man venture sent by then Harvard Museum of Comparative Zoology (MCZ) director Thomas Barbour to Australia for the dual purpose of procuring specimens and studying native (living) wildlife in its natural habitat. The Expedition leader was Harvard Professor William Morton Wheeler, with the others being Dr. Philip Jackson Darlington, Jr. (a renowned coleopterist), Dr. Glover Morrill Allen and his student Ralph Nicholson Ellis, medical officer Dr. Ira M. Dixon, and William E. Schevill (a graduate-student in his twenties as well as Associate Curator of Invertebrate Palaeontology at the MCZ). The Expedition was a success, with 341 mammal, 545 amphibian, and thousands of insect specimens returning to the United States., yet its most famous legacy and find was the accidental discovery of the world's most complete skeleton of the short-necked pliosaur Kronosaurus queenslandicus.

== Finding Specimens ==
The MCZ being "weak in Australian animals and...desires[ing] to complete its series", specimen collection was as important as observation. Operating mostly in eastern and southwestern Australia, at least four of the species they collected "were new to science". Spending a total of three months in Western Australia, the team suffered delays in assembling the collections in Sydney, "obtaining export permits from Customs," and transporting their collections back to the States. Then, in the last days of 1931, two expedition members returned as well – those being Professors Wheeler (the leader) and Allen, leaving their four counterparts in Sydney. Following the shrinkage of the team, William Schevill reports that Dr. Darlington began, and spent most of his time, collecting various insect, mammal, and bird specimens in the area around Sydney as well as in the Blue Mountains in New South Wales; indeed, "he was particularly among the mammals of this region." This was the beginning of the team working on a more individual basis rather than as a group, for Schevill set out on his own to collect three times and, in February, Ralph Ellis departed from Australia; swiftly followed by medical officer Dr. Ira Dixon as, per Schevill's report, - "his continued services...[were] no longer practicable, since Dr. Darlington and I planned to collect in rather widely separated regions. Thus only two of the original six expedition members remained.

From this point forward Schevill and Darlington met only when their work required it, the former working more closely with the then Director of the Queensland Museum (Heber A. Longman) and, through him, with Australia's Under Secretary of the Department of Agriculture and Stock (R. Wilson). The two worked together twice more, in the McPherson Range and Cairns where Darlington procured a series of tree kangaroo and Schevill worked along Lake Barrine. Indeed, noting Darlington's activities in greater detail than his own, Mr. Schevill reports that "Dr. Darlington's resourceful skill and industry had brought together, from New South Wales and Queensland, not only a large collection of insects, but also over three hundred fifty mammals, representing over sixty species, as well about fifty species of birds; in addition, he had about two hundred fifty reptiles and amphibians." However, Philip Darlington departed Australia on August 2, 1932 - leaving and making William E. Schevill the last remaining member of the original six-men expedition. And it was Schevill, the team's fossil enthusiast, who was about to make the discovery that made the Harvard Australian Expedition famous.

== Kronosaurus queenslandicus ==
In the winter of 1932, Schevill was told by the rancher R.W.H. Thomas of rocks with something "odd" poking out of them on his property near Hughenden. The rocks were limestone nodules containing the most complete skeleton of a Kronosaurus ever discovered. After dynamiting the nodules out of the ground (and into smaller pieces weighing approximately four tons) with the aid of a British migrant trained in the use of explosives, Scheville had the fossils shipped back to Harvard for examination and preparation. The skull—which matched the holotype jaw fragment of K. queenslandicus—was prepared right away, but time and budget constraints put off restoration of the nearly complete skeleton - most of the bones of which remained unexcavated within the limestone blocks - for 20 years.

=== Completion and legacy ===
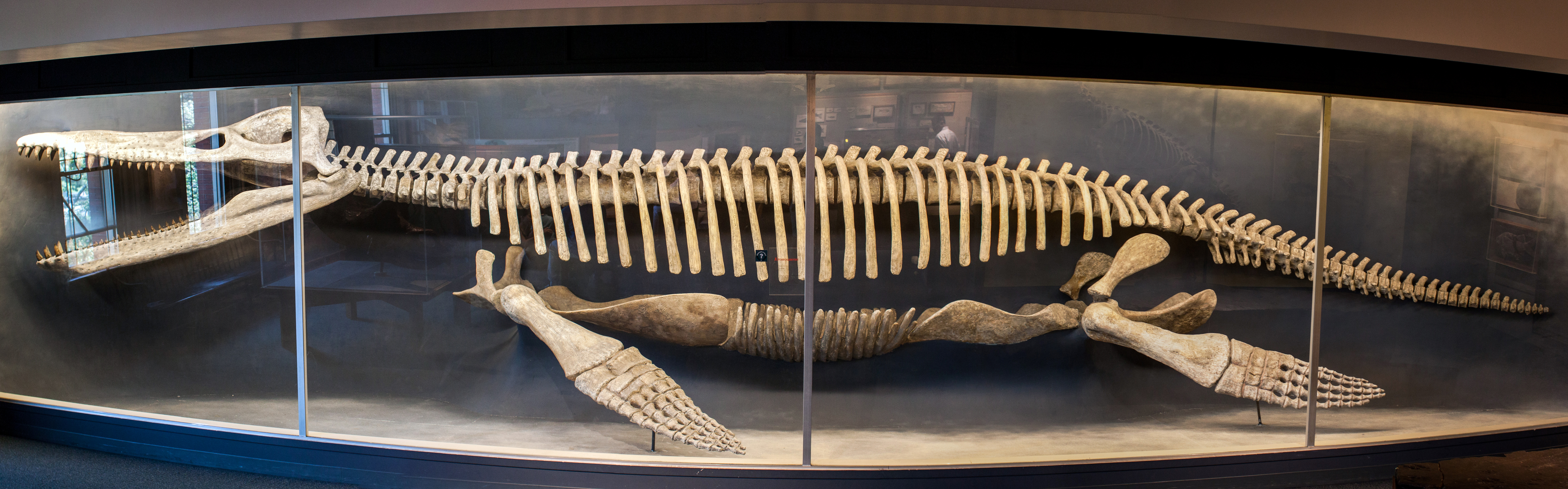
K. queenslandicus at Harvard University which may have been reconstructed with too many vertebrae

This interim ended when they came to the attention of Godfrey Lowell Cabot - Boston industrialist, philanthropist, and founder of the Cabot Corporation - "who was then in his nineties had been interested in sea serpents since childhood." Having formerly question MCZ director Alfred Romer about the existence and reports of sea serpents and it thus occurred to Dr. Romer to tell Mr. Cabot about the skeleton in the museum closet. Godfrey Cabot thus asked how much a restoration would cost and "Romer, pulling a figure out of the musty air, replied, 'Oh, about $10,000.'" Romer may not have been serious but the philanthropist clearly was because the check for said sum came shortly thereafter. Two years - and more than $10,000 - later, following the careful labor of the museum preparators, the restored and mounted skeleton was displayed at Harvard in 1959.

K. queenslandicus scale diagram, showing the size of the restored Harvard skeleton along with a more accurate estimate

However, Dr. Romer and MCZ preparator Arnold Lewis confirmed that same year in the institution's journal Breviora that "erosion had destroyed a fair fraction of this once complete and articulated skeleton...so that approximately a third of the specimen as exhibited is plaster restoration." Furthermore, the original (real) bones are also layered in plaster; a fact that, while keeping the fossils safe, makes it difficult for paleontologists to study it - an issue which factors into the controversial question of the true size of the Kronosaurus queenslandicus.

==== Size controversy ====
Body-length estimates, largely based on the 1959 Harvard reconstruction, had previously put the total length of Kronosaurus at 12.8 metres (42 ft). However, more recent studies, comparing fossil specimens of Kronosaurus to other pliosaurs suggests that the Harvard reconstruction may have included too many vertebrae, exaggerating the previous estimate, with the true length probably only 9 to 10.5 metres (30 to 34 ft).
