= Great Artesian Basin =

Large artesian aquifer in Australia

- Aquifer
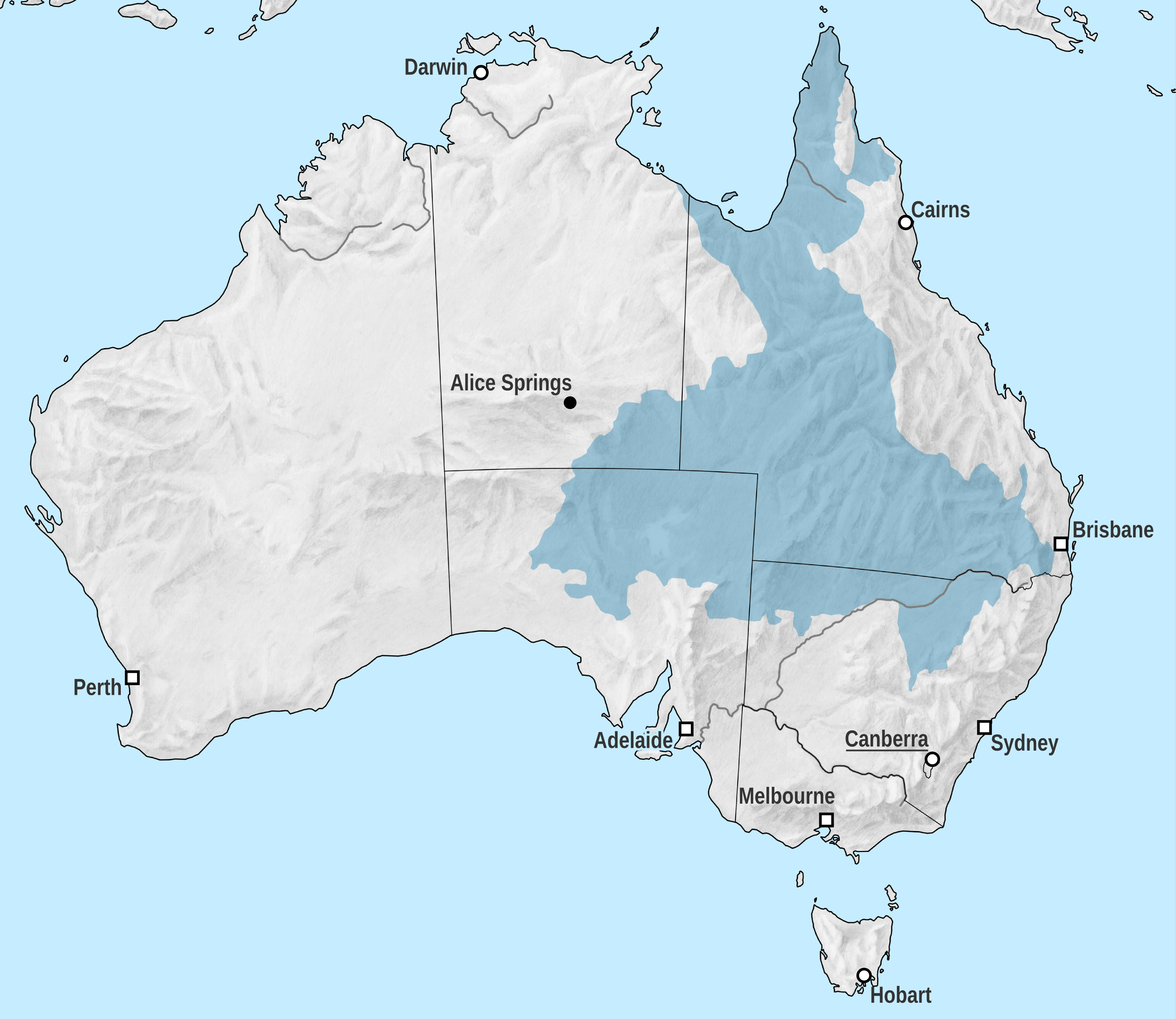
- Interactive map of Great Artesian Basin
- Location: Australia

Area
  - Total: 1,700,000 km^{2} (660,000 sq mi)

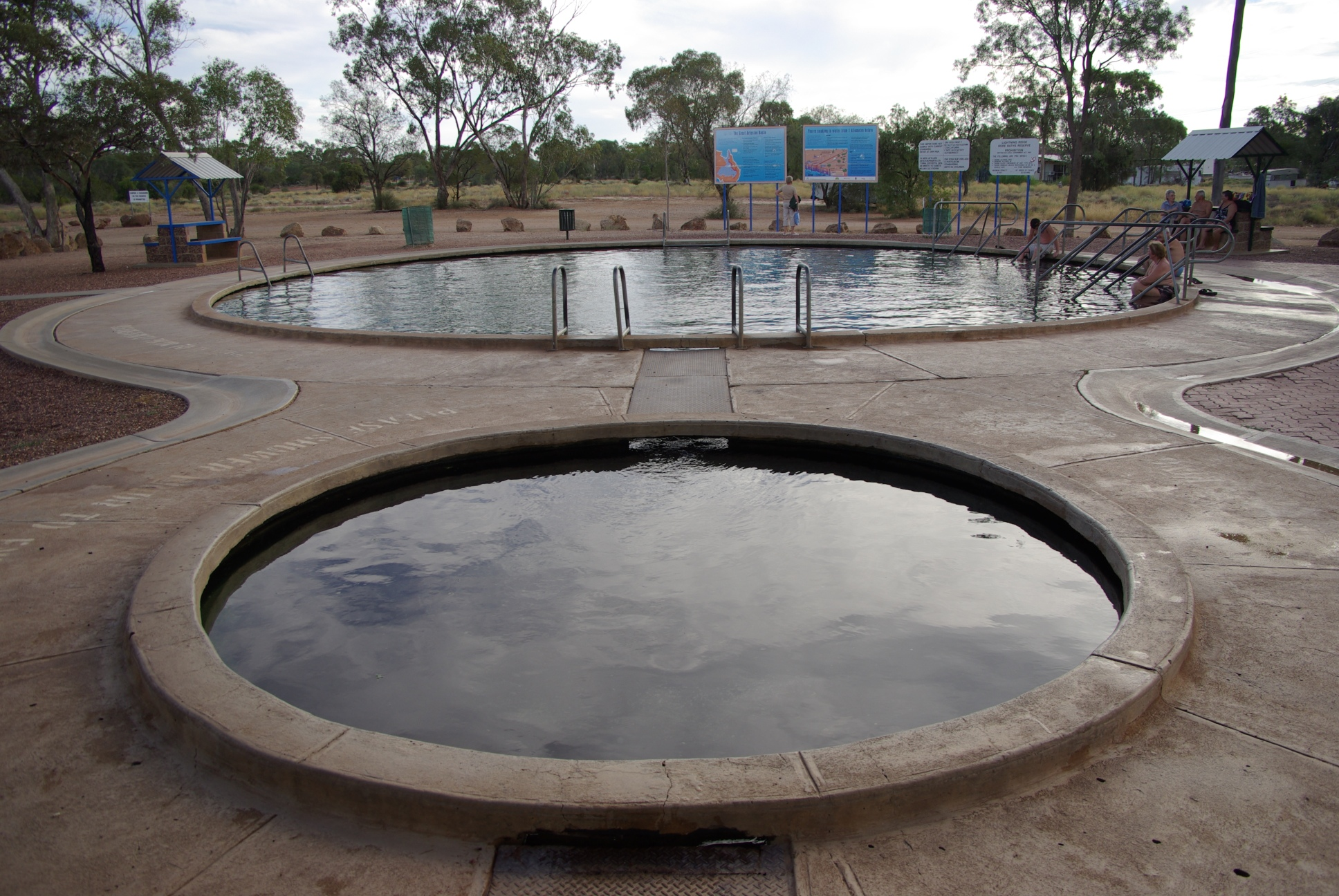
Lightning Ridge bathing thermes supplied by artesian bore water

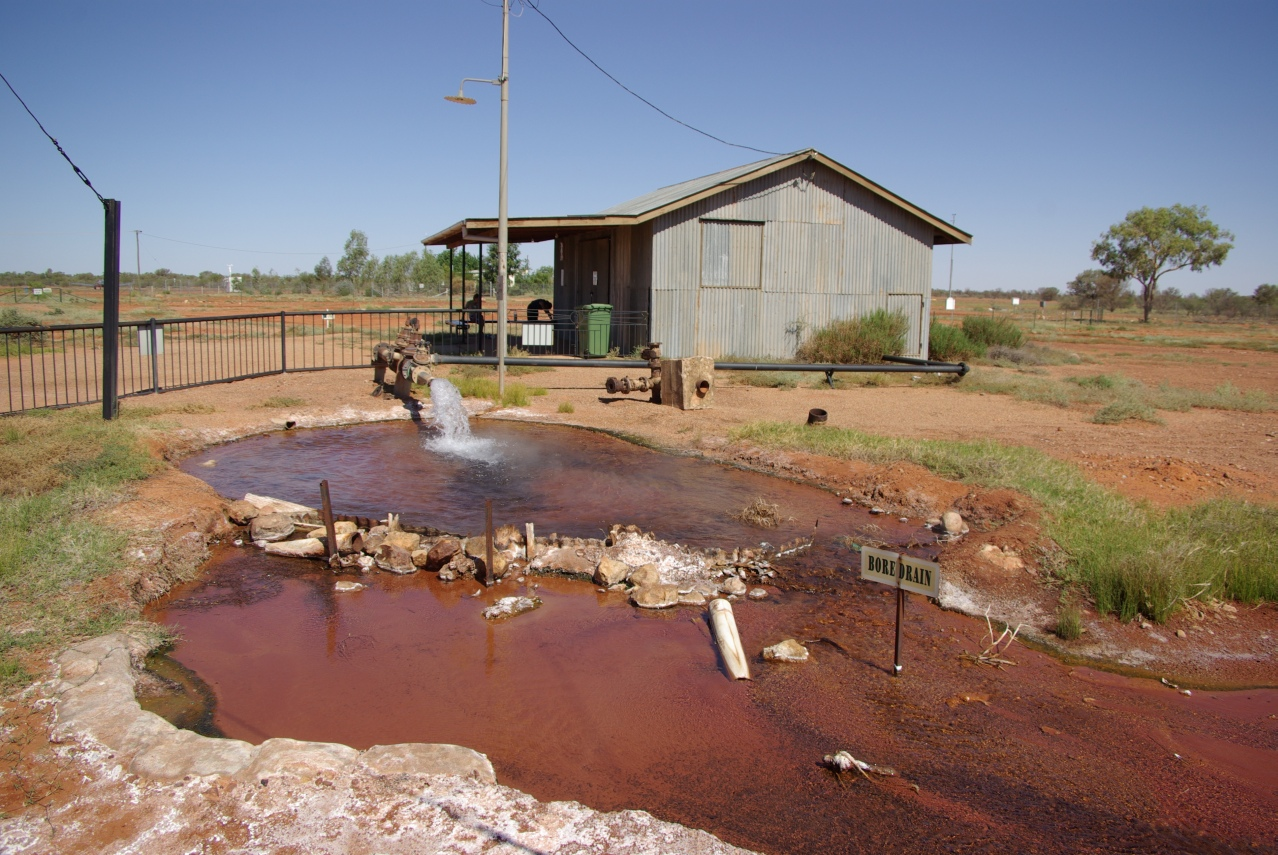
Hot water bore hole into the Great Artesian Basin in Thargomindah

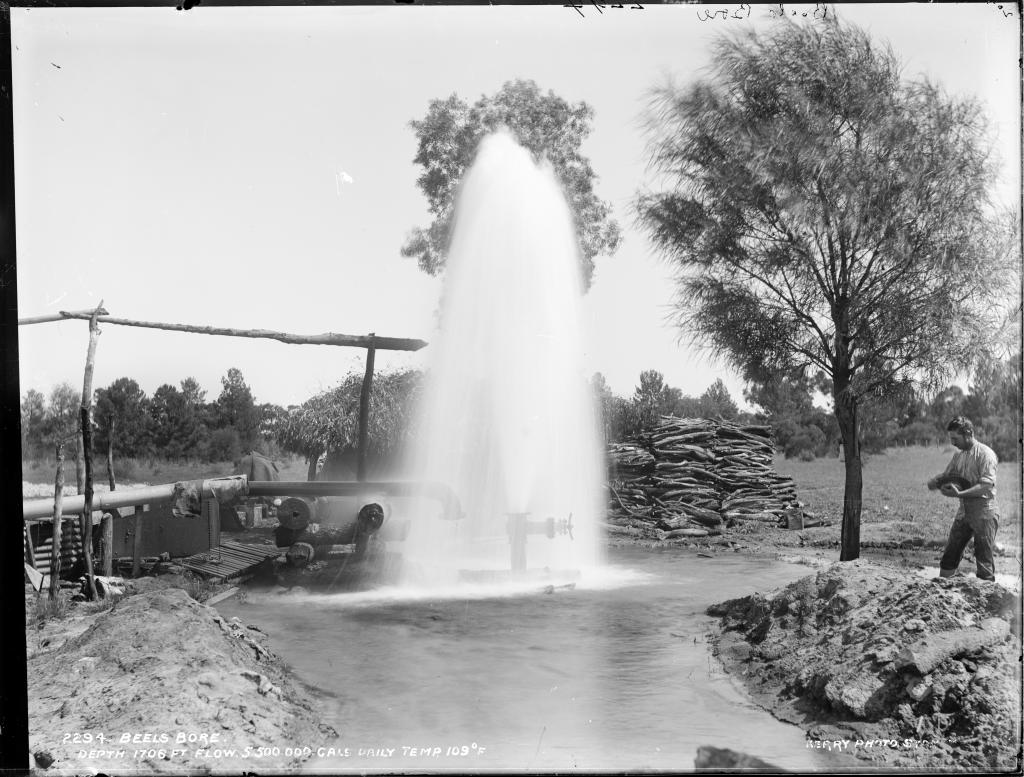
Beel's Bore, Hariman Park near Cunnamulla.

The Great Artesian Basin (GAB) of Australia is the largest and deepest artesian basin in the world, extending over 1,700,000 square kilometres (660,000 sq mi). Measured water temperatures range from 30 to 100 °C (86 to 212 °F). The basin provides the only source of fresh water through much of inland Australia.

The basin underlies 22% of the Australian continent, including most of Queensland, the south-east corner of the Northern Territory, north-eastern South Australia, and northern New South Wales. It is 3000 metres (9800 feet) deep in places and is estimated to contain 64,900 cubic kilometres (15,600 cubic miles) of groundwater. The Great Artesian Basin Coordinating Committee (GABCC) coordinates activity between federal, state/territory, and local levels of government and community organisations.

== Physiography ==
This area is one of the distinct physiographic provinces of the larger East Australian Basins division, and includes the smaller Wilcannia Threshold physiographic section.

=== Geology ===
The water of the Great Artesian Basin is held in a sandstone layer laid down by continental erosion of higher ground during the Triassic, Jurassic, and early Cretaceous periods. During a time when much of what is now inland Australia was below sea level in what is now known as the Eromanga Sea, the sandstone was covered by a layer of marine sedimentary rock, which formed a confining layer that trapped water in the sandstone aquifer. The eastern edge of the basin was uplifted when the Great Dividing Range formed. The other side was created from the landforms of the Central Eastern Lowlands and the Great Western Plateau to the west.

Most recharge water enters the rock formations from relatively high ground near the eastern edge of the basin (in Queensland and New South Wales) and very gradually flows toward the south and west. A much smaller amount enters along the western margin in arid central Australia, flowing to the south and east through the permeable sandstone, at a rate of one to five metres per year.

Discharge water eventually exits through a number of springs and seeps, mostly in the southern part of the basin. The age of the groundwater, determined by carbon-14 and chlorine-36 measurements combined with hydraulic modelling, ranges from several thousand years for the recharge areas in the north to nearly 2 million years in the south-western discharge zones.

=== Water source ===
Prior to the arrival of Europeans, waters of the Great Artesian Basin (GAB) discharged through mound springs, many in arid South Australia, such as Witjira-Dalhousie Springs. These springs sustained a variety of endemic invertebrates, such as molluscs, and supported extensive Aboriginal communities and trade routes. After the arrival of Europeans, the springs facilitated exploration, and allowed the provision of faster communications between south-eastern Australia and Europe, via the Australian Overland Telegraph Line. The Great Artesian Basin became an important water supply for cattle stations, irrigation, and livestock and domestic purposes, and is a vital lifeline for rural Australia. To tap it, boreholes are drilled down to a suitable rock layer, and the pressure of the water often forces it up without the need for pumps.

The discovery and use of the water in the Great Artesian Basin allowed the settlement of thousands of square kilometres of country away from rivers in inland New South Wales, Queensland, and South Australia, that would otherwise have been unavailable for pastoral activities. European discovery of the basin dates from 1878 when a shallow bore near Bourke produced flowing water. There were similar discoveries in 1886 at Back Creek east of Barcaldine, and in 1887 near Cunnamulla.

In essence, water extraction from the GAB is a mining operation, with recharge much less than current extraction rates. In 1915, there were 1,500 bores providing 2,000 megalitres (1,600 acre⋅ft) of water per day, but today the total output has dropped to 1,500 megalitres (1,200 acre⋅ft) per day. This included just under 2,000 freely-flowing bores and more than 9,000 that required mechanical power to bring water to the surface. Many bores are unregulated or abandoned, resulting in considerable water wastage. These problems have existed for many decades, and in January 2007 the Australian Commonwealth Government announced additional funding in an attempt to bring them under control. However, many of the mound springs referred to above have dried up due to a drop in water pressure, probably resulting in extinction of several invertebrate species.

The Olympic Dam mine in South Australia is permitted to extract up to 42 megalitres (1.5×10^{6} cu ft) of water daily from the Great Artesian Basin under the Roxby Downs (Indenture Ratification) Act 1982. The underground copper and uranium mine commenced operations in 1988 and is expected to continue operating until approximately 2060.

In addition, the Basin provides water, via a 1.2-kilometre-deep (3/4 mi) bore, for a geothermal power station at Birdsville. Water emerges from the bore at 98 °C (208 °F) and provides 25% of the town's electricity needs. After being cooled, the water is also the source of the town's drinking water.

== Whole of Basin management ==
The Great Artesian Basin underlies parts of Queensland, New South Wales, South Australia and the Northern Territory, which each operate under different legislative frameworks, policies, and resource management approaches. In 2020 the Australian government Department of Climate Change, Energy, the Environment and Water published the Great Artesian Basin Strategic Management Plan, which was prepared together with the individual governments and in consultation with the GABCC, stakeholders, and public feedback.

The Great Artesian Basin Coordinating Committee (GABCC) provides advice from community organisations and agencies to state, territory, and Australian government ministers on efficient, effective, sustainable whole-of-Basin resource management and to coordinate activity between stakeholders.

Membership of the Committee comprises all state, territory, and Australian government agencies with responsibilities for management of parts of the Great Artesian Basin, community representatives nominated by agencies; and sector representatives.

== Environmental concerns ==
In 2011, ABC TV's public affairs program Four Corners revealed that significant concerns were being expressed about depletion and chemical damage to the Basin as a result of coal seam gas extraction. In one incident, reported in the program, the Queensland Gas Company (QGC) "fracked" its Myrtle 3 well connecting the Springbok aquifer to the coal seam below (the Walloon Coal Measures) in 2009. A local farmer was concerned that the process might have released 130 litres (29 imp gal; 34 US gal) of a potentially toxic chemical into the Basin. QGC admitted the incident, but "did not alert authorities or nearby water users about the problem until thirteen months after the incident". The safety data sheet QGC had submitted for the hydraulic fracturing chemical was derived from the United States, incomplete and ten years out of date.

Over thirty chemicals may be used in the process of hydraulic fracturing and their long-term impact on aquifers, agriculture, and people supported by them has been quantifiable and verified for quite some time. Lead, aluminium, arsenic, barium, boron, nickel, and uranium have all been found above recommended levels in the groundwater contaminated by coal seam gas. Instances of groundwater being contaminated and by extension poisoning the ecosystems sustained by the availability of groundwater have been widely documented, and are an exacerbating factor in regards to the population's capability to cope with drought through usage of groundwater sources in Australia.

Glencore planned to inject up to 110,000 tonnes of carbon dioxide per year into a groundwater formation in the basin. Hydrogeologist Ned Hamer stated that the carbon dioxide would increase the acidity of the water to the extent that it would dissolve the rock, releasing heavy metals into the water and making it unusable. After producer advocacy group AgForce took the Federal Government along with Glencore to court, the Queensland Government rejected the proposal in May 2024, and subsequently banned carbon capture and storage using the Great Artesian Basin.

== See also ==
- Geology of Australia
- Guarani Aquifer
- Eromanga Sea
