= Glover Morrill Allen =

American zoologist (1879–1942)

Glover Morrill Allen (February 8, 1879 – February 14, 1942) was an American zoologist.

Born in Walpole, New Hampshire, the son of Reverend Nathaniel Glover Allen and Harriet Ann (Schouler) Allen, he studied at Harvard College. While still a student, Allen published The Birds of Massachusetts and A List of the Birds of New Hampshire. After graduating in 1901, he was appointed librarian to the Boston Society of Natural History. He obtained an A.M. from Harvard in 1903 and in 1904, obtained a Ph.D. from Harvard. From 1924, he lectured in zoology at Harvard and held the position of Curator of Mammals in the Museum of Comparative Zoology.

He traveled widely, to Central and South America, to East and West Africa, the Nile, the Belgian Congo as a member of the eight-man Harvard Medical African Expedition (1926–1927), and Australia as a member of the six-man Harvard Australian Expedition (1931–1932) along with his student, Ralph Nicholson Ellis.

His publications include: Bats: Biology, Behavior and Folklore (1939), which in its time was regarded as the leading introduction to the chiroptera, Checklist of African Mammals, and Mammals of China and Mongolia. He was elected a Fellow of the American Academy of Arts and Sciences in 1915, and the president of the American Society of Mammalogists from 1927 to 1929.

Allen is commemorated in the scientific names of two species of lizards: Adolfus alleni and Bachia alleni.

== See also ==
- Taxa named by Glover Morrill Allen
