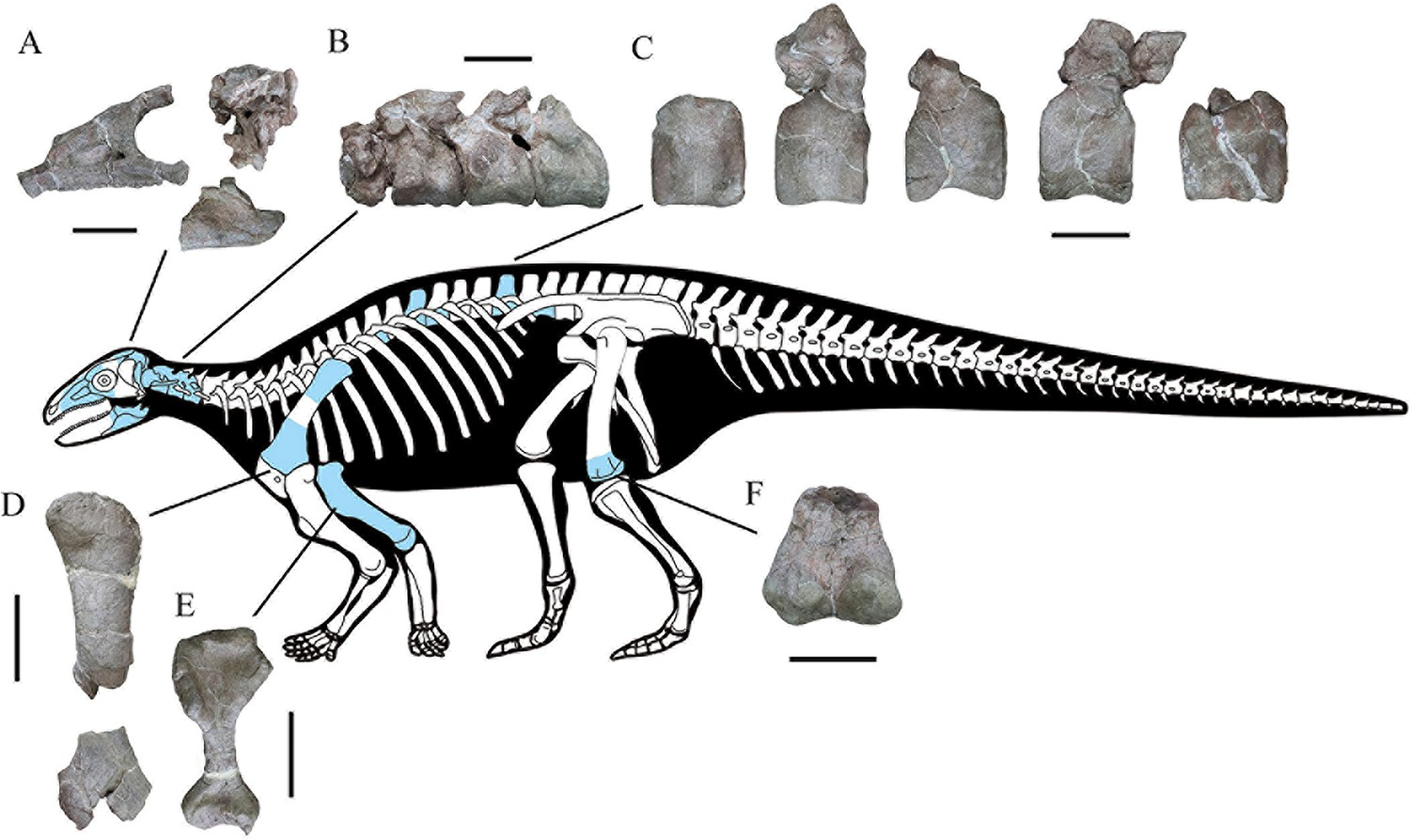
- Skeletal diagram excluding osteoderms

Scientific classification
- Kingdom: Animalia
- Phylum: Chordata
- Class: Reptilia
- Clade: Dinosauria
- Clade: †Ornithischia
- Clade: †Thyreophora
- Genus: †Yuxisaurus; Yao et al., 2022
- Species: †Y. kopchicki

Binomial name
- †Yuxisaurus kopchicki Yao et al., 2022

= Yuxisaurus =

Yuxisaurus Temporal range: Early Jurassic, Sinemurian–Toarcian

Genus of thyreophoran dinosaurs

Yuxisaurus (lit. 'Yuxi lizard') is an extinct genus of early thyreophoran dinosaur from the Early Jurassic (Sinemurian-Toarcian) Fengjiahe Formation of southwestern China. The genus contains a single species, Yuxisaurus kopchicki, known from a partial skeleton and many osteoderms.

== Discovery and naming ==
Size compared to a human

The name "Yuxisaurus kopchicki" first appeared in a bioRxiv preprint released in late 2021. In March 2022, Xi Yao and colleagues formally described it as a new genus and species of early-diverging armored dinosaur. The holotype specimen, CVEB 21701, consists of a partial skeleton including parts of the skull, several vertebrae, partial limb bones, and at least 120 osteoderms.

The generic name, Yuxisaurus, combines a reference to the type locality in Yuxi, Yunnan Province, China, with the Greek "sauros", meaning "lizard." The specific name, kopchicki, honors the biologist John J. Kopchick.

== Classification ==
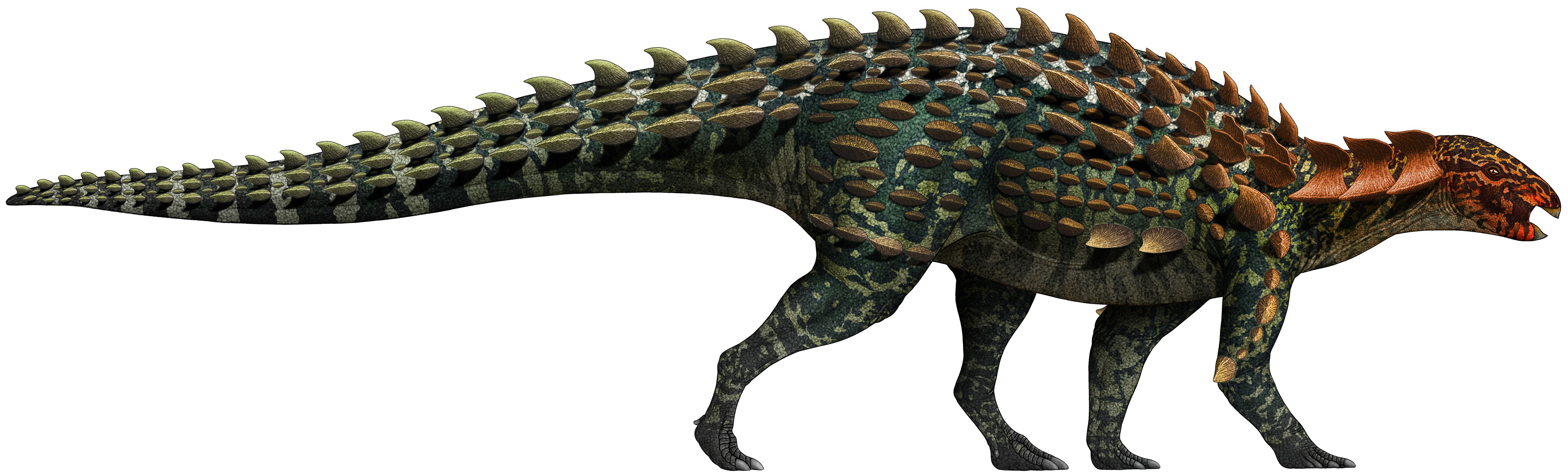
Speculative life restoration

In their 2022 description of Yuxisaurus, Yao and colleagues identified it as a basal member of the Thyreophora. Depending on the phylogenetic dataset used to test its position, it was recovered as either the sister taxon to the German Emausaurus (in a clade sister to Scelidosaurus + Ankylosauria) or diverging after Emausaurus, but before Scelidosaurus and eurypodans (ankylosaurs + stegosaurs). The discovery of Yuxisaurus definitively proves that thyreophorans were present in Asia during the Early Jurassic, as other potential records of Early Jurassic Asian thyreophorans, Bienosaurus and Tatisaurus, are too fragmentary to yield a confident identification.

Topology A: Norman dataset

- Thyreophora
  - Stegosauria
  - "Ankylosauromorpha"
    - Scutellosaurus
    - - - Emausaurus
        - Yuxisaurus
      - - Scelidosaurus
        - Ankylosauria

Topology B: Maidment et al. dataset

- Thyreophora
  - - Laquintasaura
    - Scutellosaurus
  - - Emausaurus
    - - Yuxisaurus
      - - Scelidosaurus
        - Eurypoda
          - Ankylosauria
          - Stegosauria

In 2026, Agnolín and colleagues described several skeletal elements from the Late Cretaceous Allen Formation of Argentina that they referred to Patagopelta cristata. While this species was initially described as a nodosaurid ankylosaur in 2022, later analyses and discussions preferred parankylosaurian affinities. To test the relationships of Patagopelta, Agnolín et al. added it to the phylogenetic matrix of Raven et al. (2023), a dataset designed to test the relationships of all armored dinosaurs, which had not previously sampled parankylosaurs in detail. Using an updated version of this matrix, Agnolín et al. (2026) conducted their phylogenetic analysis under equal weighting (Topology A below) and implied weighting (Topology B below). Both versions recovered Stegouros, Antarctopelta, Patagopelta, Kunbarrasaurus, and Minmi as parankylosaurs.

Their implied weights analysis notably recovered Yuxisaurus as the earliest-diverging member of the Parankylosauria, a result that has poor statistical support but is based on at least two shared anatomical characters. These include the morphology of the cervical (neck) vertebrae and certain distinctive osteoderm morphologies. Both taxa have large osteoderms over the distal (toward the end) caudal (tail) vertebrae described as 'pup-tent'-like in morphology, and the cervical half-rings in both bear keeled lateral osteoderms and spine-like distal osteoderms, all of which are fused at the base. This placement is also consistent with earlier discoveries of relatives of Cretaceous dinosaur taxa from the Southern Hemisphere in Jurassic/Early Cretaceous rocks in China. Both analyses recovered Parankylosauria outside of its traditional placement within Ankylosauria. Instead, it was placed as the sister taxon to Eurypoda (ankylosaurs + stegosaurs) or in an unresolved polytomy with these clades and Yuxisaurus. The authors argued that Parankylosauria should be regarded as a lineage distinct from Ankylosauria, in part due to many plesiomorphic ('ancestral') traits in parankylosaur skeletons.

Topology A: Equal weights analysis

- Thyreophora
  - Emausaurus
  - - Scutellosaurus
    - - Scelidosaurus
      - Eurypoda
        - Yuxisaurus
        - Stegosauria
        - Ankylosauria
        - Parankylosauria
          - Stegouros
          - - Antarctopelta
            - Kunbarrasaurus
            - Minmi
            - Patagopelta

Topology B: Implied weights analysis

- Thyreophora
  - Scutellosaurus
  - - Emausaurus
    - - Scelidosaurus
      - - Eurypoda
          - Stegosauria
          - Ankylosauria
        - Parankylosauria
          - Yuxisaurus
          - - Stegouros
            - - Antarctopelta
              - Kunbarrasaurus
              - Minmi
              - Patagopelta
