= Patagopelta =

Patagopelta Temporal range: Late Cretaceous (Campanian–Maastrichtian)
- Skeletal reconstruction showing known osteoderms (top) and other skeletal remains (bottom) in white

Scientific classification
- Kingdom: Animalia
- Phylum: Chordata
- Class: Reptilia
- Clade: Dinosauria
- Clade: †Ornithischia
- Clade: †Thyreophora
- Clade: †Ankylosauria (?)
- Clade: †Parankylosauria
- Genus: †Patagopelta; Riguetti et al., 2022
- Species: †P. cristata

Binomial name
- †Patagopelta cristata Riguetti et al., 2022

Genus of nodosaurid dinosaurs

Patagopelta (meaning "Patagonian shield") is an extinct genus of ankylosaurian dinosaur from the Late Cretaceous (upper Campanian–lower Maastrichtian) Allen Formation of Argentina. The genus contains a single species, P. cristata, known from several partial skeletons, isolated bones, and osteoderms. While originally described as a member of the family Nodosauridae, later discoveries provided support for parankylosaurian affinities. Patagopelta is a small armored dinosaur, comparable in size to the 'dwarf' nodosaurid Struthiosaurus, at about 2 m (6.6 ft) long. It is larger, more robust, and more heavily armored than other paranklyosaurs such as Stegouros.

== Discovery and naming ==
The Patagopelta fossil material was found in sediments of the Allen Formation (Salitral Moreno locality) near General Roca, Río Negro Province, Argentina. This locality is dated to the upper Campanian to lower Maastrichtian ages of the Late Cretaceous period. The first remains were described in 1996 and often appeared in the literature as the "Argentinian ankylosaur". The fossil material consists of various osteoderms, a tooth, dorsal and caudal vertebrae, and femora. The Patagopelta holotype specimen, MPCA-SM-78, is represented by a cervical half-ring element.

New remains described in 2022 allowed Patagopelta cristata to be described as a new genus and species of nodosaurine dinosaurs by Facundo Riguetti, Xabier Pereda-Suberbiola, Denis Ponce, Leonardo Salgado, Sebastián Apesteguía, Sebastián Rozadilla, and Victoria Arbour. The generic name, "Patagopelta", is derived from "Patago", a reference to the discovery of the taxon in Argentinian Patagonia, and the Greek word "pelta", meaning "shield". The specific name, "cristata", means "crested" in Latin, referring to the large crests on its cervical osteoderms and femur.

In 2026, Agnolín and colleagues described several new skeletal elements from the Allen Formation that they referred to Patagopelta. This material was found in multiple localities throughout the formation and includes skull bones, incomplete limb bones, several vertebrae from various regions, pelvic bones, and many osteoderms. The researchers acknowledged that the material may not all belong to Patagopelta, but preferred to assign everything to it due to a lack of evidence for any other thyreophoran taxa in the formation. This new material—assuming it all belongs to Patagopelta—indicates it is more heavily armored, more robustly built, and larger in size than the related parankylosaurs Stegouros and Antarctopelta. It also has the distinctive frond-like 'macuahuitl' tail weapon seen in these genera.

== Classification ==
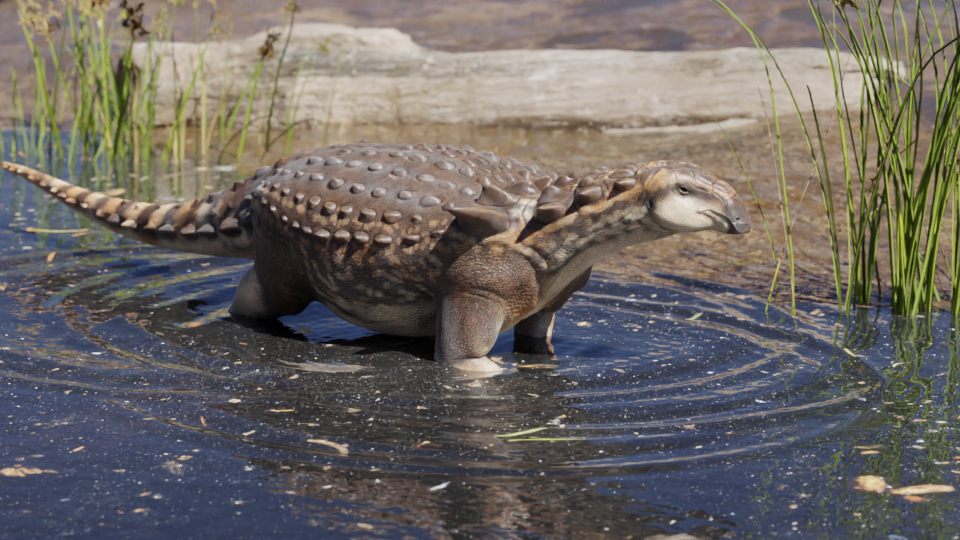
Speculative restoration of Patagopelta as a nodosaurid

In their phylogenetic analyses, Riguetti et al. (2022) recovered Patagopelta as a member of the Nodosaurinae, within a clade of entirely North American nodosaurids from the middle of the Cretaceous period, in contrast to previous analyses that recovered it in the Panoplosaurini. In either case, these results would suggest that nodosaurids were part of a migration event of North American fauna into South America. The cladogram below displays the results of their phylogenetic analyses.

- Nodosauridae
  - - Cedarpelta
    - Hylaeosaurus
  - - Gastonia
    - - Gargoyleosaurus
      - - Peloroplites
        - Hoplitosaurus
        - Panoplosaurus
        - - Mymoorapelta
          - - Taohelong
            - - Edmontonia spp.
        - - Stegopelta
          - Animantarx
          - - - Hungarosaurus
              - Europelta
          - - Struthiosaurus spp.
          - Nodosaurinae
            - Niobrarasaurus
            - - Nodosaurus
              - - - Sauropelta
                  - Tatankacephalus
                - - Patagopelta
                  - - Texasetes
                    - - "Paw Paw scuteling"
                      - - Borealopelta
                        - Ahshislepelta

Size of Patagopelta (as a parankylosaur) compared to a human

A study published in 2024 by Agnolín and colleagues reviewed vertebrate fossils from the Cerro Fortaleza Formation and similar Patagonian formations. They mentioned new findings that suggest that Patagopelta may actually represent a parankylosaurian, similar to ankylosaurs like Antarctopelta rather than nodosaurids. In their 2024 redescription of Antarctopelta, Soto Acuña, Vargas & Kaluza further elaborated on this, explaining that the discovery of additional fossil material allowed for a rescoring of its characters in their phylogenetic matrix. Based on these updates, they recovered Patagopelta within the Parankylosauria, along with other Cretaceous Gondwanan ankylosaurs. Their results are displayed in the cladogram below:

- Ankylosauria
  - Parankylosauria
    - Kunbarrasaurus
    - cf. Kunbarrasaurus (SAMA P40536)
    - Patagopelta
    - Stegouros
    - Antarctopelta
  - - - Liaoningosaurus
      - Chuanqilong
    - - Ankylosauridae
      - Nodosauridae

In their 2026 description of additional Patagopelta remains, Agnolín and colleagues tested its relationships using the phylogenetic matrix of Raven et al. (2023), a dataset designed to test the relationships of all armored dinosaurs, which had not previously sampled parankylosaurs in detail. Using an updated version of this matrix, Agnolín et al. (2026) conducted their phylogenetic analysis under equal weighting (Topology A below) and implied weighting (Topology B below). Both versions recovered Patagopelta as a parankylosaur, alongside Stegouros, Antarctopelta, Kunbarrasaurus, and Minmi. Their implied weights analysis also recovered Yuxisaurus, a Jurassic thyreophoran from China, as the earliest-diverging member of the Parankylosauria. Both analyses recovered Parankylosauria outside of its traditional placement within Ankylosauria. Instead, it was placed as the sister taxon to Eurypoda (ankylosaurs + stegosaurs) or in an unresolved polytomy with these clades and Yuxisaurus. The authors argued that Parankylosauria should be regarded as a lineage distinct from Ankylosauria, in part due to many plesiomorphic ('ancestral') traits in parankylosaur skeletons.

Topology A: Equal weights analysis

- Thyreophora
  - Emausaurus
  - - Scutellosaurus
    - - Scelidosaurus
      - Eurypoda
        - Yuxisaurus
        - Stegosauria
        - Ankylosauria
        - Parankylosauria
          - Stegouros
          - - Antarctopelta
            - Kunbarrasaurus
            - Minmi
            - Patagopelta

Topology B: Implied weights analysis

- Thyreophora
  - Scutellosaurus
  - - Emausaurus
    - - Scelidosaurus
      - - Eurypoda
          - Stegosauria
          - Ankylosauria
        - Parankylosauria
          - Yuxisaurus
          - - Stegouros
            - - Antarctopelta
              - Kunbarrasaurus
              - Minmi
              - Patagopelta

== Paleoecology ==
Patagopelta is known from the Late Cretaceous Allen Formation of Río Negro Province, Argentina. Fragmentary ankylosaur remains, including teeth, osteoderms, and a partial sacrum, are also known from this formation, found in association with bones and eggs of the coeval alvarezsaurid Bonapartenykus. However, this material appears to belong to a taxon distinct from Patagopelta, providing insight into the diversity and faunal composition of armored dinosaurs in this formation.

Many other dinosaurs, including titanosaurs (Aeolosaurus, Bonatitan, Menucocelsior, Panamericansaurus, Pellegrinisaurus, and Rocasaurus), hadrosaurids (Bonapartesaurus, Kelumapusaura, and Lapampasaurus), abelisaurids (Niebla and Quilmesaurus), and dromaeosaurids (Austroraptor) have been named from the formation. Birds (Lamarqueavis and Limenavis), pterosaurs (Aerotitan), rhynchocephalians (Lamarquesaurus), plesiosaurs (Kawanectes), and dryolestoid and gondwanathere mammals have also been described from the formation.

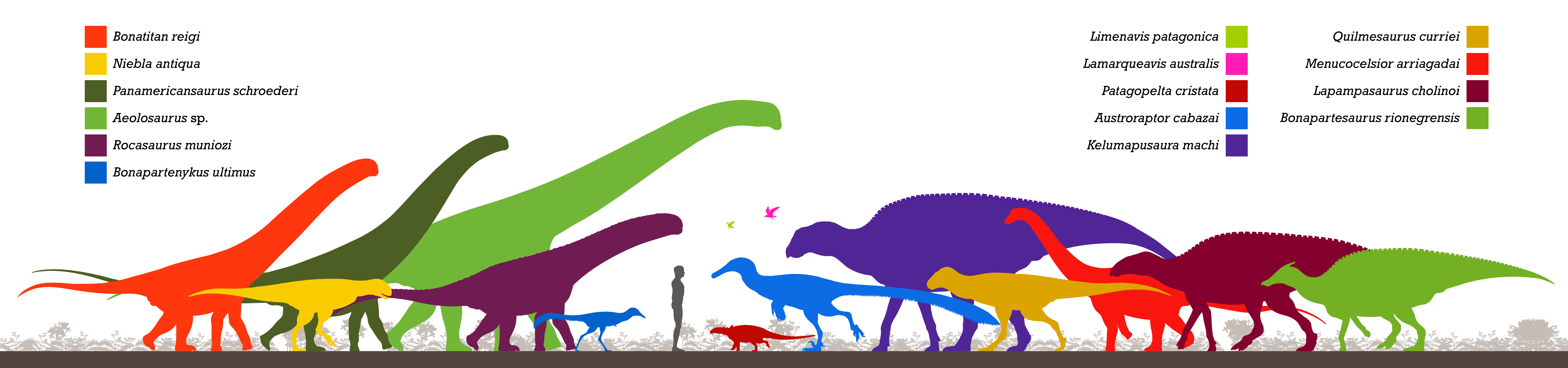
Dinosaur fauna of the Allen Formation (Patagopelta in red, center right)
