= Minmi (disambiguation) =

Minmi (born 1974) is a Japanese hip hop singer.

Minmi may also refer to:

- Minmi paravertebra, a dinosaur species found in Australia
- Minmi, New South Wales, a suburb of Newcastle, New South Wales, Australia
