= Ralph Molnar =

Ralph E. Molnar is a paleontologist who had been Curator of Mammals at the Queensland Museum and more recently associated with the Museum of Northern Arizona. He is also a research associate at the Texas Natural Science Centre. He co-authored descriptions of the dinosaurs Muttaburrasaurus, Kakuru, Minmi and Ozraptor, as well as the mammal Steropodon.
