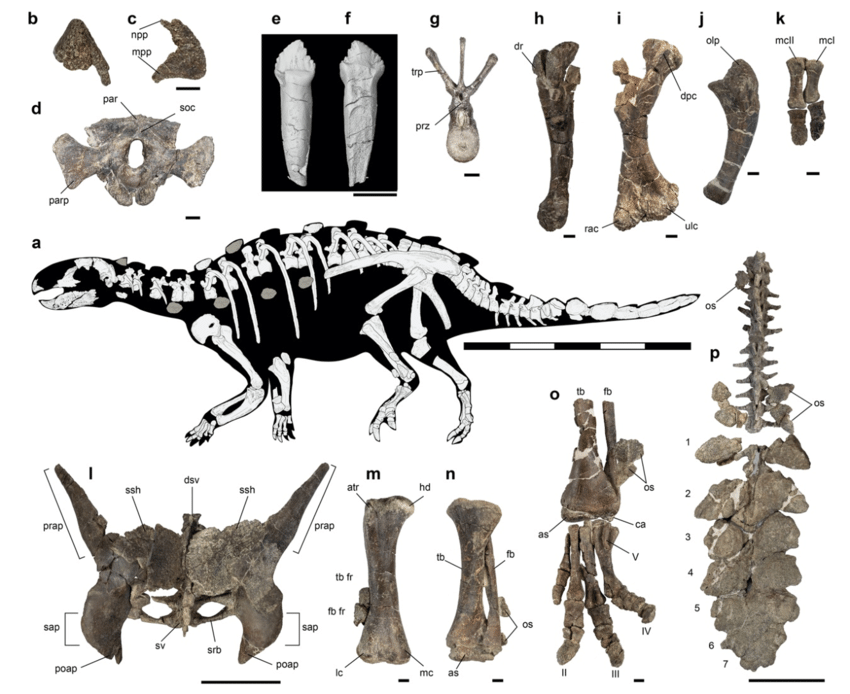
- Reconstructed skeleton and select elements of the holotype

Scientific classification
- Kingdom: Animalia
- Phylum: Chordata
- Class: Reptilia
- Clade: Dinosauria
- Clade: †Ornithischia
- Clade: †Thyreophora
- Clade: †Ankylosauria (?)
- Clade: †Parankylosauria
- Genus: †Stegouros; Soto-Acuña et al., 2021
- Species: †S. elengassen

Binomial name
- †Stegouros elengassen Soto-Acuña et al., 2021

= Stegouros =

Stegouros Temporal range: Late Cretaceous (Campanian to Maastrichtian), 74.9–71.7 Ma

Extinct genus of dinosaurs

Stegouros (/ˌstɛɡəˈjʊərɒs/, meaning "roofed tail") is an extinct genus of ankylosaurian dinosaurs from the Late Cretaceous Dorotea Formation of southern Chile. The genus contains a single species, Stegouros elengassen, known from a semi-articulated, near-complete skeleton. Stegouros is a member of the Parankylosauria, a clade of small Gondwanan armored dinosaurs. It is characterized by its small body size and distinct arrangement of fused osteoderms forming a macuahuitl-like tail weapon.

== Discovery ==
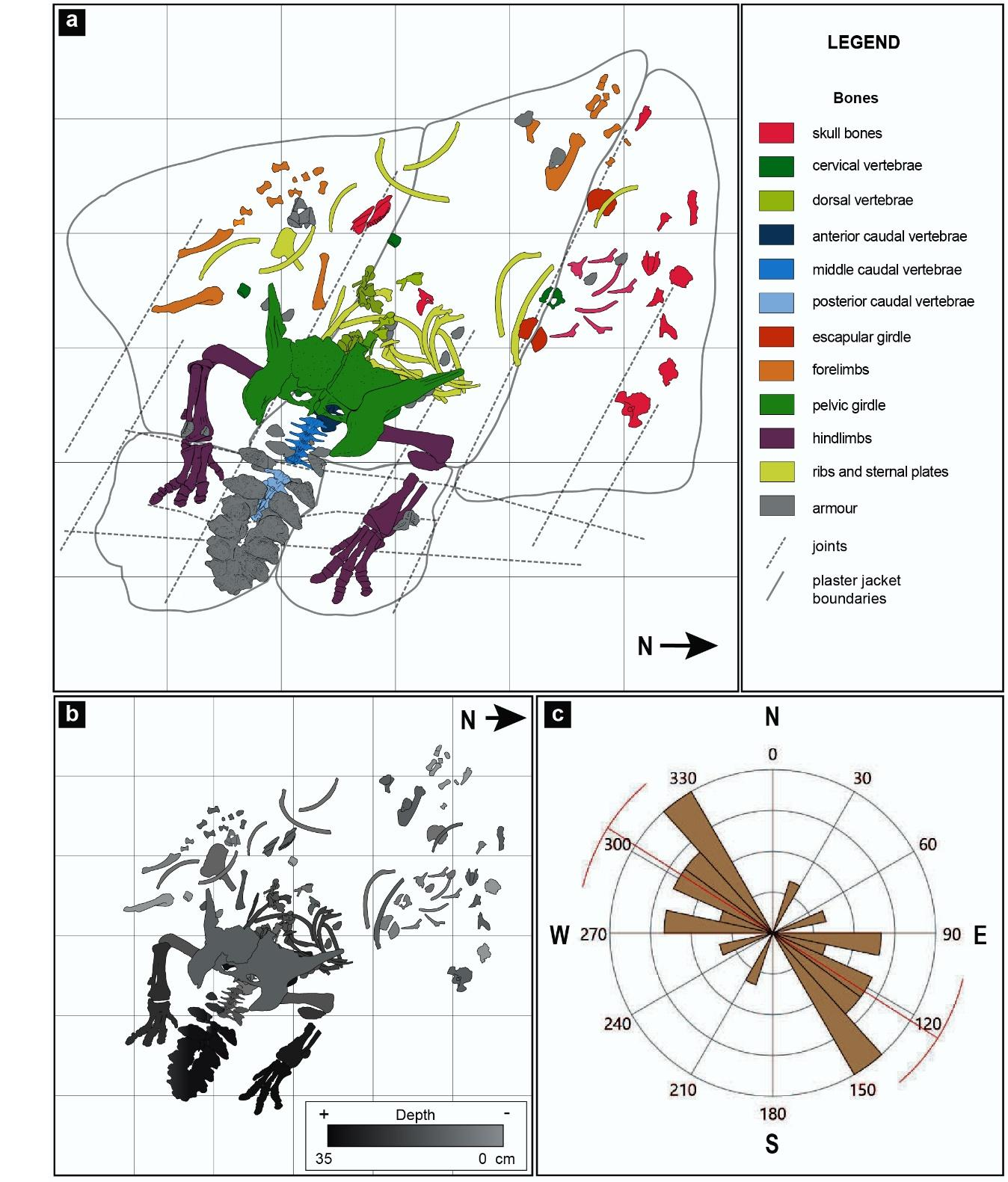
The skeleton as found in situ

In February 2018, the skeleton of a small ankylosaur was recovered by a team of Texan researchers near the Río de las Chinas valley of Ultima Esperanza province in the Magallanes y la Antártica Chilena region of southern Chile.

In 2021, the type species Stegouros elengassen was named and described by Sergio Soto-Acuña et al. The generic name combines the Greek stegos, meaning "roof" and oura, meaning "tail", referring to the roof-like covering of the tail end. The specific name elengassen is derived from an armoured creature in the mythology of the Aónik'enk, the indigenous inhabitants of the region where the holotype was discovered.

The holotype specimen, CPAP-3165, was found in a layer of the Dorotea Formation dating from the upper Campanian. It consists of a relatively complete skeleton with skull and lower jaws. The rear part, the hindlimbs, sacrum, pelvis and tail, was preserved articulated. The front parts were scattered over a small surface. It lacks the skull roof, the rear lower jaws, the shoulder blades, the right humerus and the pubic bones. Some osteoderms were recovered. It represents an adult individual.

== Description ==
=== Size and distinguishing traits ===
Size compared to a human

Stegouros is a very small ankylosaur. It was estimated at to be about 1.8–2 metres (5.9–6.6 ft) long and stood less than two feet tall. Only the tail was considered to be strictly distinctive. Unlike all other known Ankylosauria, the tail is short with no more than twenty-six caudal vertebrae, the last twelve of which are covered by seven pairs of large osteoderms, the last five of which again are fused together to form a flat connected structure.

Stegouros differs from its close relative Antarctopelta in its smaller body size, relatively larger neural canal, longer dorsosacral vertebrae, higher and narrower vertebral bodies of the sacral vertebrae, absence of ossified tendons on the tail, teeth with six serrations on the anterior margin instead of seven or eight, and cingula, thickened tooth crown bases, without vertical grooves. Stegouros differs from Kunbarrasaurus by having a curved instead of straight ulna and radius and a process from the maxilla running towards the lacrimal bone that is narrower and sloping backwards.

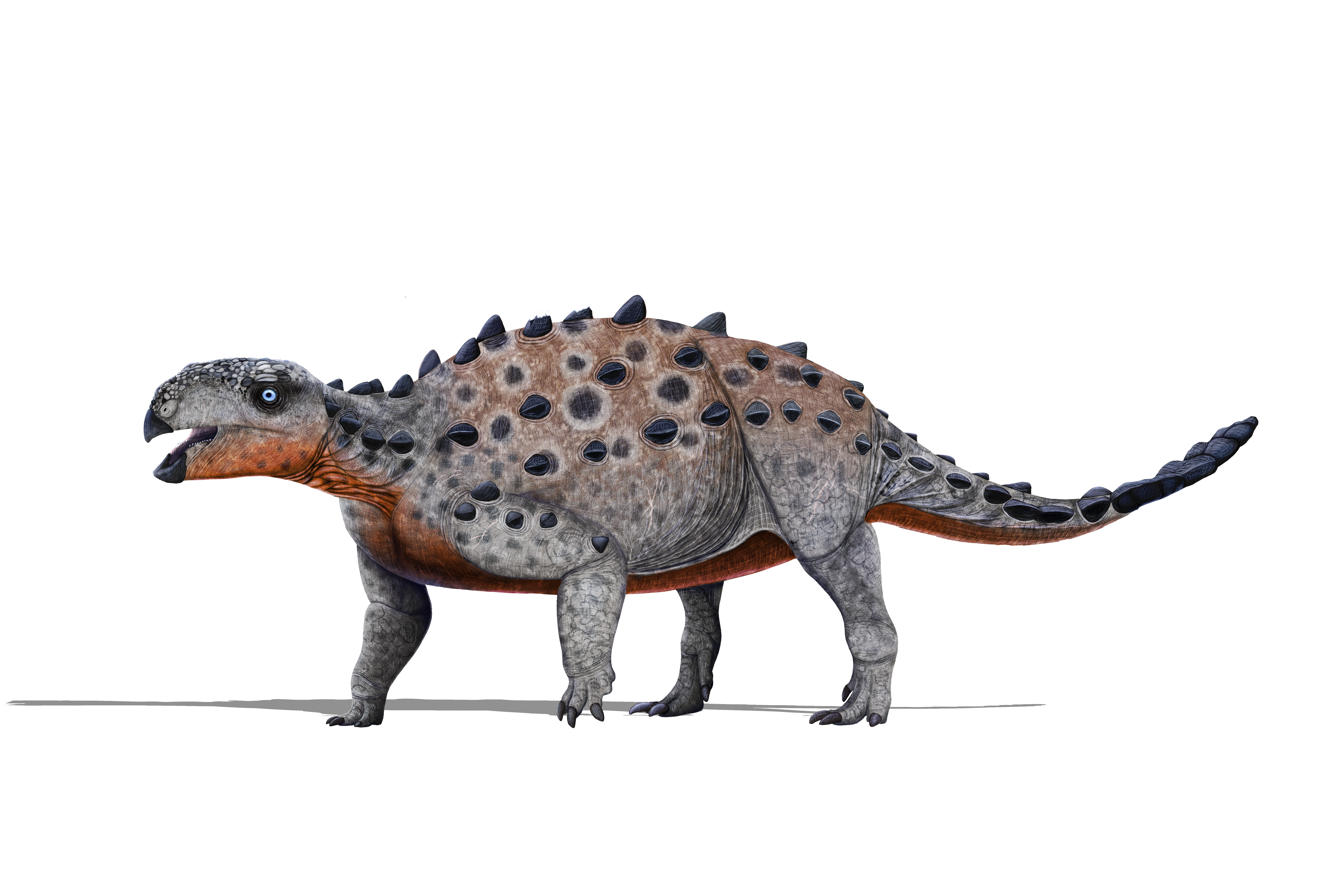
Speculative life restoration

=== Cranium ===
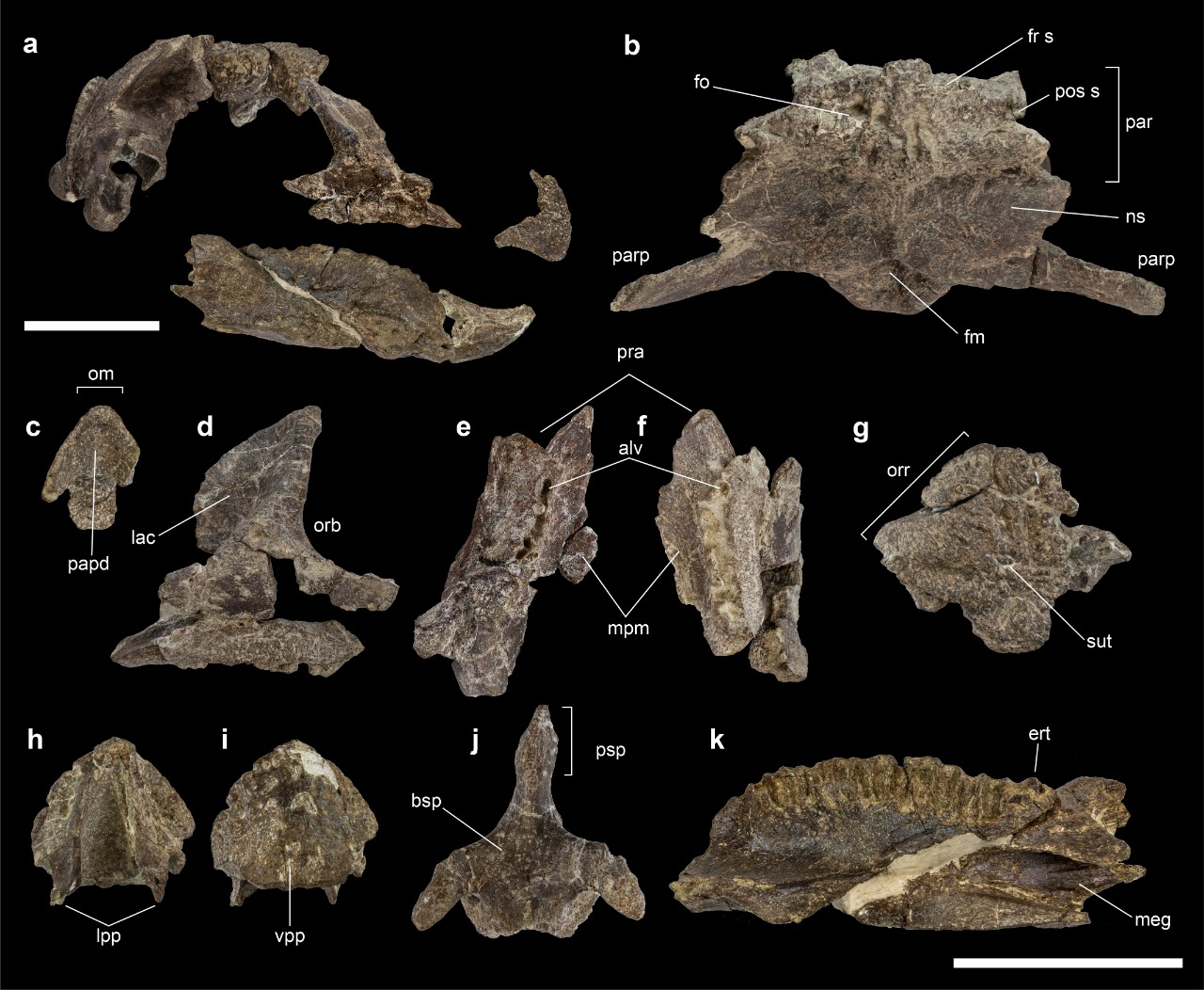
Skull material

The head is probably proportionally large, though it is difficult to precisely gauge the proportions due to limited preservation. The praemaxillae of the front snout are toothless, short, high and narrow, and completely fused at the midline. The front palate to which they contribute is high. The maxillary bones merge seamlessly into the plate-shaped lacrimal bones that slope backwards. The maxillary bones have internal branches that form a secondary palate. The row of teeth starts slightly in front of the lacrimal bone and continues below the eye socket. The entire top of the eye socket is formed by fused supraoccipitalia that form a continuous thickened canopy. Similar to Kunbarrasaurus the posterior parts of the skull are not fused so that the sutures remain visible. These parts are rough with pits so that raised bone pates or horn plates were probably present. In the lateral braincase, the basisphenoid is short, shorter than the basioccipital of the lower occiput.

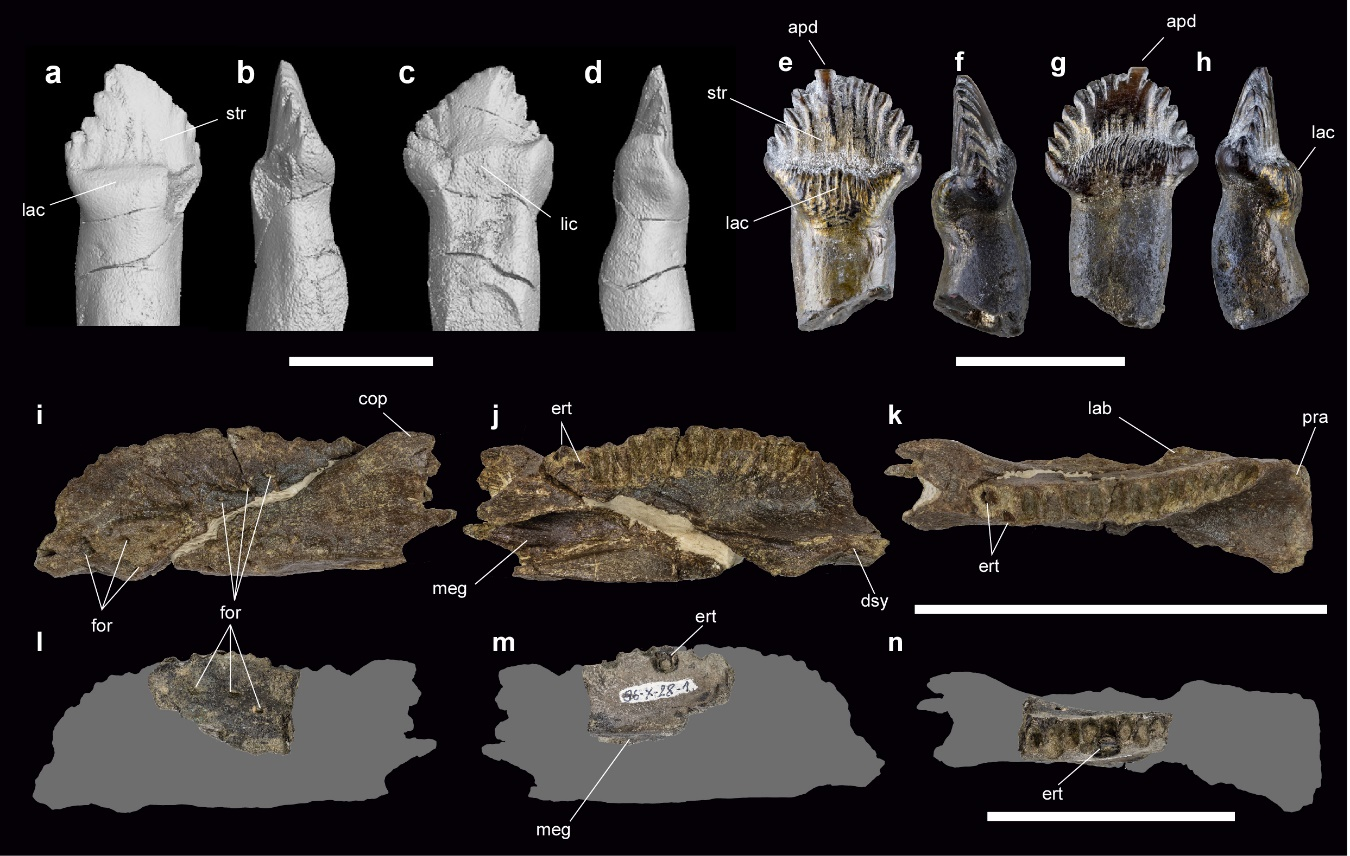
Comparison of the mandibles and teeth of Stegouros and Antarctopelta

In the lower jaws, the central predentary, the bony core of the lower bill, is short and high with thin upper branches that are longer than the lower branches. The dentarium or os dentale is undulating in side view. The row of teeth is curved inwards, so that the rows of teeth of the lower jaws combined show an hourglass shape when viewed from above. The dentarium bears fourteen teeth, some of which the fossil preserves. The dentary teeth are leaf-shaped and high. The teeth are asymmetrical in external view. They have a convex cingulum that extends upwards into fluted ridges ending in serrations. The cingulum is asymmetrical: horizontal when seen from the outside but an arc seen viewed the inside, that is slightly oblique towards the front.

=== Postcrania ===
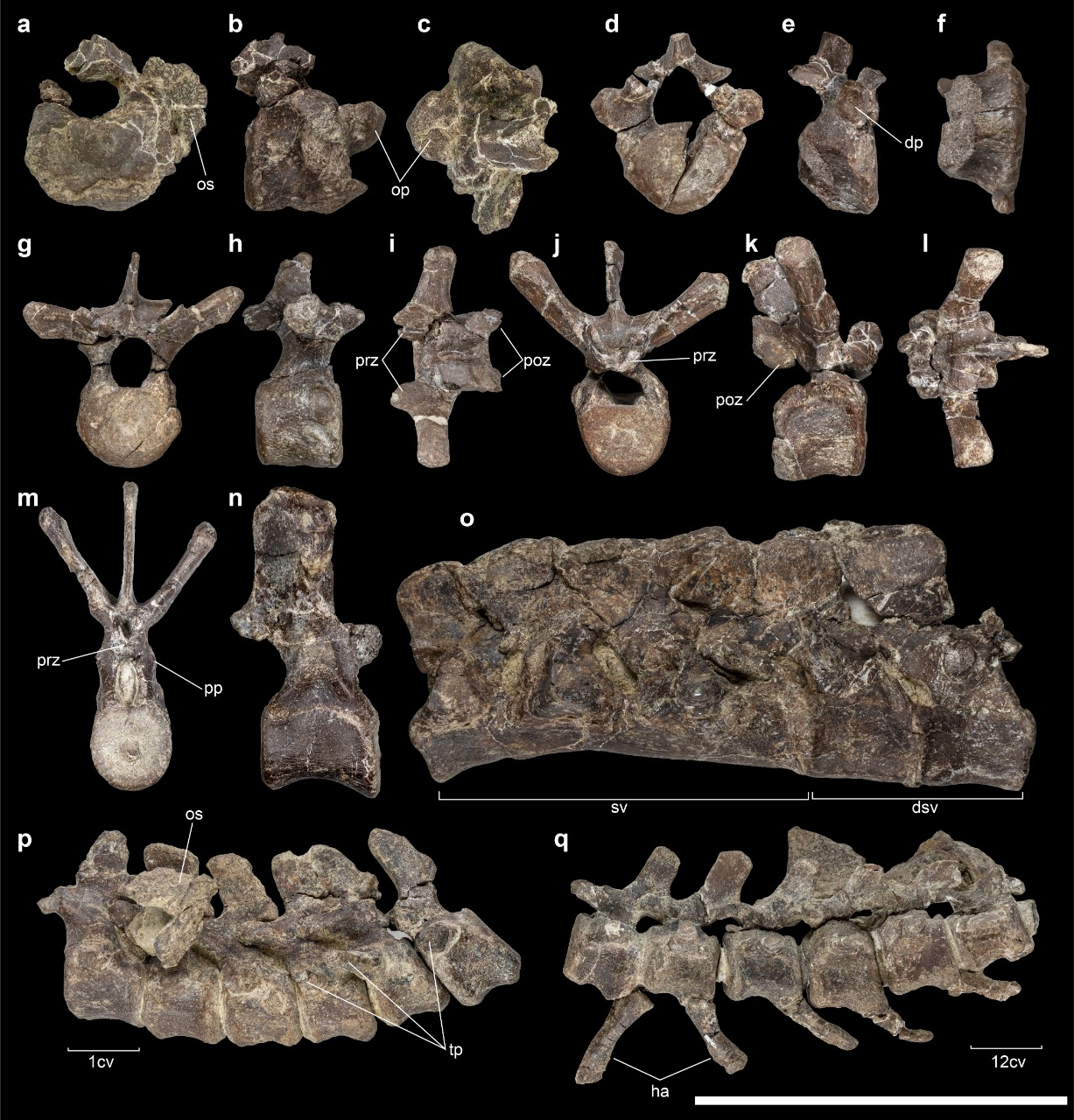
Vertebrae

The cervical vertebrae are short. The vertebral centra are wider than they are long, a typical ankylosaur feature, but they have hollow sides like Stegosauria. Towards the rear of the vertebral column, the transverse processes rise steeper, up to 60° on the posterior back. The vertebrae have high neural arches with both the pedicles and the neural spines reaching a considerable length. The anterior joint processes are U-shaped in top view. The sacrum has four true sacral vertebrae and an anterior sacral rod of two captured dorsosacrals that touch the ilium with short ribs but are not fused to it. At the rear, the sacrum lacks caudosacrals, a basal feature shared with Antarctopelta.

The humerus has a slender shaft, a basal feature. However, the ends are strongly transversely broadened, especially in the epiphyses, and there is a well-developed deltopectoral crest projecting anteriorly. On the outer posterior margin of the humerus, a conspicuous ridge runs downwards with a small bump at the upper end, in the same position in which Stegosauria have a tubercule for the attachment of the musculus triceps brachii. The radius is slender but the ulna is robust and broadened at the top with a well-developed olecranon, an upper projection to bend the elbow. An ulnare was presumably present in the wrist; this is indicated by the discovery in the left wrist of a small U-shaped element that is connected to the proximal surface of the fifth metacarpal bone. The hand claws are hoof-shaped, not pointed. The second finger is reduced to two phalanges as in the Stegosauria. The second finger ends in a flat disc-shaped phalanx that is blunt and probably no longer had a claw at all. More such phalanges have been found around both hands, suggesting the same was true for the third, fourth and fifth fingers.

In the pelvis, the horizontal ilium has a very long and low anterior blade. It curves strongly forwards and to the sides, apparently to support a wide abdominal cavity. The rest of the ilium is very similar to that of the Stegosauria. The position and shape of the horizontal lateral ridge above the hip joint, i.e. semicircular, and the shape of the rear blade suggest that the latter turned inward during growth. The ischium is long and lacks an obturator projection on the anterior margin. The ischia are not fused together at their distal ends. The ischium tapers downwards with a slight bend forward halfway through. Nothing of the pubic bones has been found.

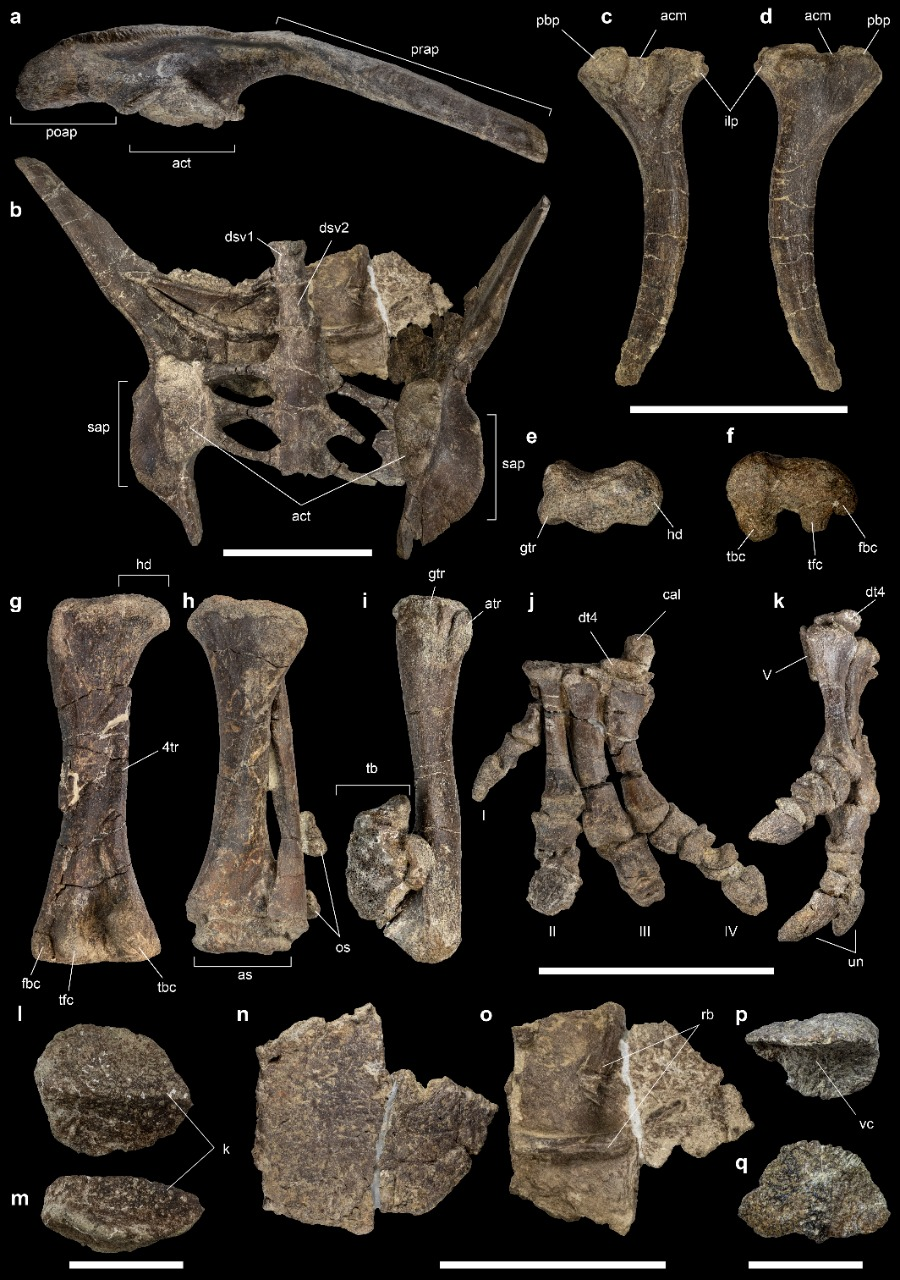
Hindlimbs and pelvis

The thighbones are only slightly longer than the shinbones. In this, Stegouros is closer to running ancestors who had a noticeably shorter femur. Later Ankylosauria typically have very short lower legs. The femur is straight and not bent as in running forms. The fourth trochanter, the protrusion on the posterior femoral shaft that served to attach the tail retractor muscle, is small and shaped like a vertical ridge. The lesser trochanter is fused with the greater trochanter.

As with running forms, the feet are quite narrow. The third and fourth metatarsal bones have long contact surfaces at the top. This indicates that the midfoot was not spread out to support the weight, as is the case with most Ankylosauria and Stegosauria. The number of phalanges has not been reduced. At the third and fourth toes, however, the extreme phalanx is not in the shape of a claw but is a flat disc. Those claws present are shaped like hooves.

The shoulder blades (scapulae) were not found. The coracoids are not fused with the shoulder blades. The sternal plates are unfused, and have long lateral tubular processes at the back that project caudolaterally.

=== Osteoderms ===
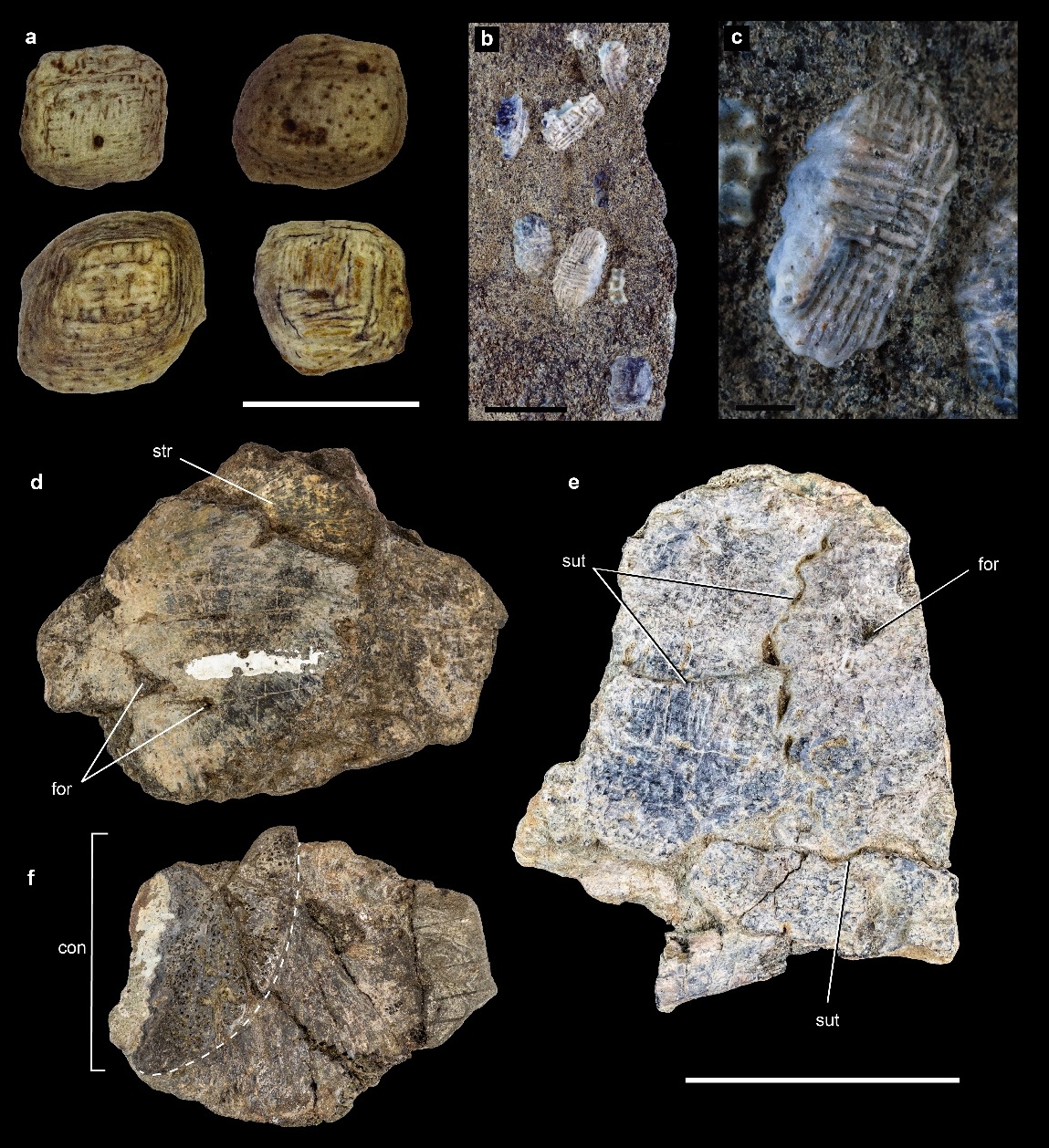
Comparison of the osteoderms of Stegouros and Antarctopelta

Osteoderms of the head were not found. It may be that those in Stegouros did not ossify or that the individual of the holotype was not old enough to have completed ossification.

At the second cervical vertebra, the axis, a flat bone plate with a length of nineteen millimeters was found. Apart from this, no large elements of the neck, such as cervical halfrings, were recovered. Eight medium-sized scutes have been found, oval and keeled with a length of four to five centimeters. Some other ankylosaurians are known to have such osteoderms to protect the flanks. These eight scutes were not in apparent association with any skeletal element except one that was directly adjacent to a neural arch of a vertebra. The small number of such scutes may indicate that the rump was not very heavily armored. Near the left hand was a cluster of four smaller osteoderms, fifteen to twenty millimeters in diameter, with more pointed keels. On the upper right ulna is a small round bone plate, keeled with a concave inner surface, next to a flat triangular osteoderm. Keeled osteoderms were found on the outside of the feet, three on the left foot and two on the right foot.

Between the ilium and the neural spines of the sacrum is a continuous thin layer of ossified skin armor covered with vein grooves and pits. This indicates the presence of some kind of sacral shield as in Nodosauridae. However, it differs in that it is not made up of fused ossicles.

Two pairs of small cone-shaped osteoderms with pointed keels and concave lower surfaces are present at the base of the tail. Very distinctive is the so-called "tail weapon". Ankylosaurids typically have a tail club but the Stegouros weapon has a very distinct build, representing a type not yet known from Ankylosauria. It has been compared by the describers to the maquahuitl, the Aztec mace. The weapon consists of seven pairs of flattened osteoderms that form an elongated structure that covers the tip of the tail. The first pair has sharp keels, the tips of which point towards the rear and sides. Their upper surfaces are, apart from that, more flattened while the lower sides are more conically curved. The inner sides, facing the tail vertebra, are strongly hollowed out. On their undersides are two pairs of smaller cone-shaped osteoderms fused, resembling those on the tail base, one pair pointing obliquely to the rear and the other obliquely sideways and downwards. The next pair is larger and covers two entire vertebrae. It is flatter and lacks the small osteoderms on the underside. The construction of the next five pairs is similar, but they have grown together with their leading and trailing edges to form one whole. They are still separately recognizable as pentagonal plates with pointed ends. At the very end, this structure also covers the undersides of the vertebrae. At the extreme tail tip is an eighth pair of small knob-shaped osteoderms.

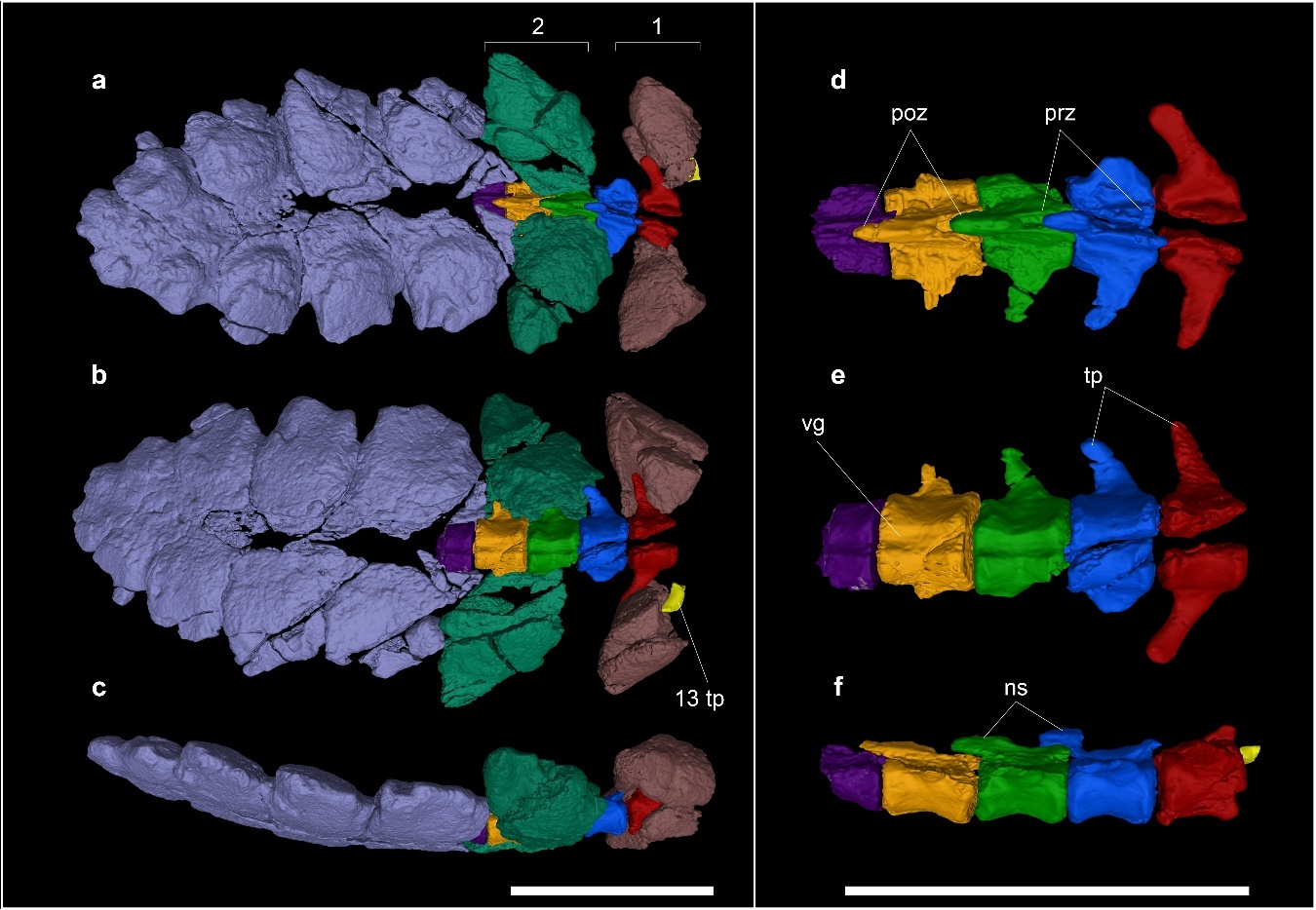
Tail osteoderms

Numerous ossicles in the form of circular disks, four to five millimeters in diameter, were found around all skeletal elements. They are flattened into an oblate spheroid with an almost square profile. The outer sides are covered with numerous pits, indicating a thick stratum corneum. On the undersides there are perpendicular intersecting notches for the attachment of fibers that presumably connect the plates to the skin. Those notches are typical for Parankylosauria. Thus, a flexible armor was formed.

Thirteen "free" vertebrae have been preserved in the tail base. Five additional vertebrae are enclosed in a structure made of osteoderms that has been compared to an Aztec macuahuitl. After the eighteenth vertebra, all the vertebrae are missing: only the cavity within the macuahuitl gives an indication of how many were present. The authors estimate the maximum number of these to be eight, which would imply that there were only twenty-six tail vertebrae; the lowest number in all of Thyreophora was thirty-five until 2021, in Scelidosaurus. The vertebrae of the tail are amphiplatyan to platycoel: flat on both ends or slightly concave at the rear. The lateral processes are long, twice longer than the neural spines, and are still present as far as the tail weapon. In the seventh through twelfth vertebrae, the neural spines are somewhat thickened at the top and shorter than the neural arches. Behind the twelfth vertebra, the undersides have a longitudinal groove and are as long as they are wide but very low. The inner cavity of the tail weapon is correspondingly flattened. At the fifteenth to eighteenth vertebrae, which are in the weapon, a CAT scan shows that the anterior joint processes, the prezygapophyses, are short while the posterior joint processes extend over the posterior vertebra, fused together on their inner sides to form a wedge-shaped structure in top view, filling a corresponding V-shaped space between the anterior joint processes of the posterior vertebra. This system must have stiffened the tail tip. However, no ossified tendons are used for this as with the Ankylosauridae, because they are completely lacking. Flattened vertebrae have also been found in Antarctopelta, suggesting that a similar tail weapon was present in that species.

== Classification ==
Stegouros was found by Soto-Acuña et al. to belong to a distinct lineage of small ankylosaurs known from the Cretaceous of southern Gondwana, also including Kunbarrasaurus from Australia and Antarctopelta from the Antarctic Peninsula. diverging before Ankylosauridae and Nodosauridae together, which was named Parankylosauria. The results of this phylogenetic analysis are shown below:

- - Lesothosaurus
  - - Scutellosaurus
    - - Emausaurus
      - - Scelidosaurus
        - Eurypoda
          - Stegosauria
            - Huayangosaurus
            - Stegosauridae
          - Ankylosauria
            - Parankylosauria
              - Kunbarrasaurus
              - - Antarctopelta
                - Stegouros
            - Euankylosauria
              - Nodosauridae
              - - Liaoningosaurus
                - - Gobisaurus
                  - - Shamosaurus
                    - Ankylosaurinae

The discovery of Stegouros has an important implication for the early history of ankylosaurians; it revealed that a novelly discovered, distinct lineage of ankylosaurs, the Parankylosauria, exist, diverging from Euankylosauria (the combined clade of Ankylosauridae and Nodosauridae) very early in the Cretaceous and surviving until the Maastrichtian, distinguished by a unique tail weapon, dubbed 'macuahuitl', evolved convergently to ankylosaurid tail clubs. It also suggests, through phylogenetic bracketing, that two genera found to be related by analyses by Soto-Acuña et al. (Antarctopelta and Kunbarrasaurus) possessed the same tail weapon.

== Paleoenvironment ==
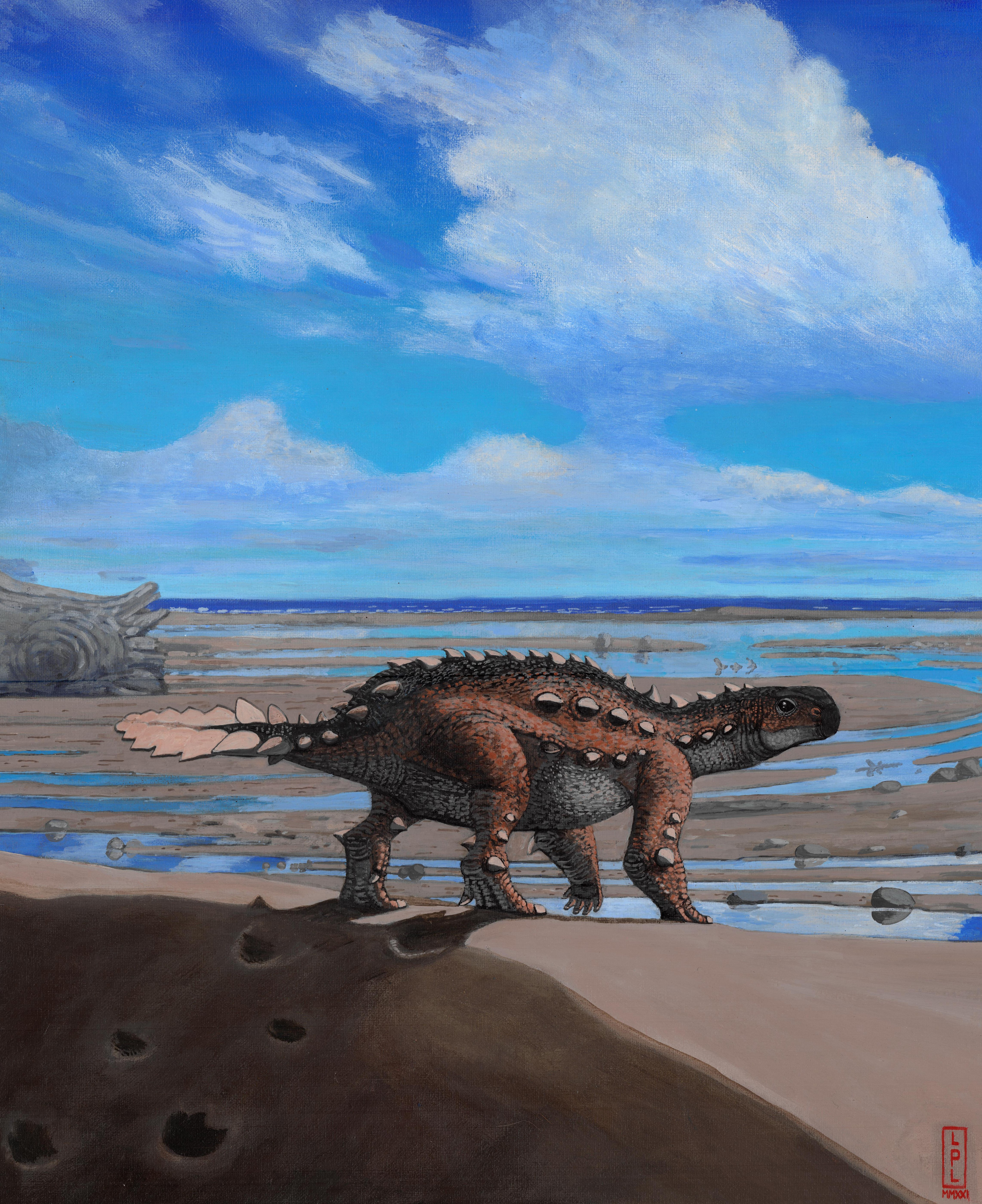
Life restoration of Stegouros in its environment

Stegouros was discovered in layers of the Dorotea Formation. The Dorotea Formation dates to the late Campanian-Maastrichtian, between 71.7 ± 1.2 and 74.9 ± 2.1 million years ago. Fossils belonging to amphibians, mammals, fish, reptiles, and several invertebrates have also been discovered there, along with material belonging to indeterminate sauropod, theropod, and ornithischian dinosaurs.
