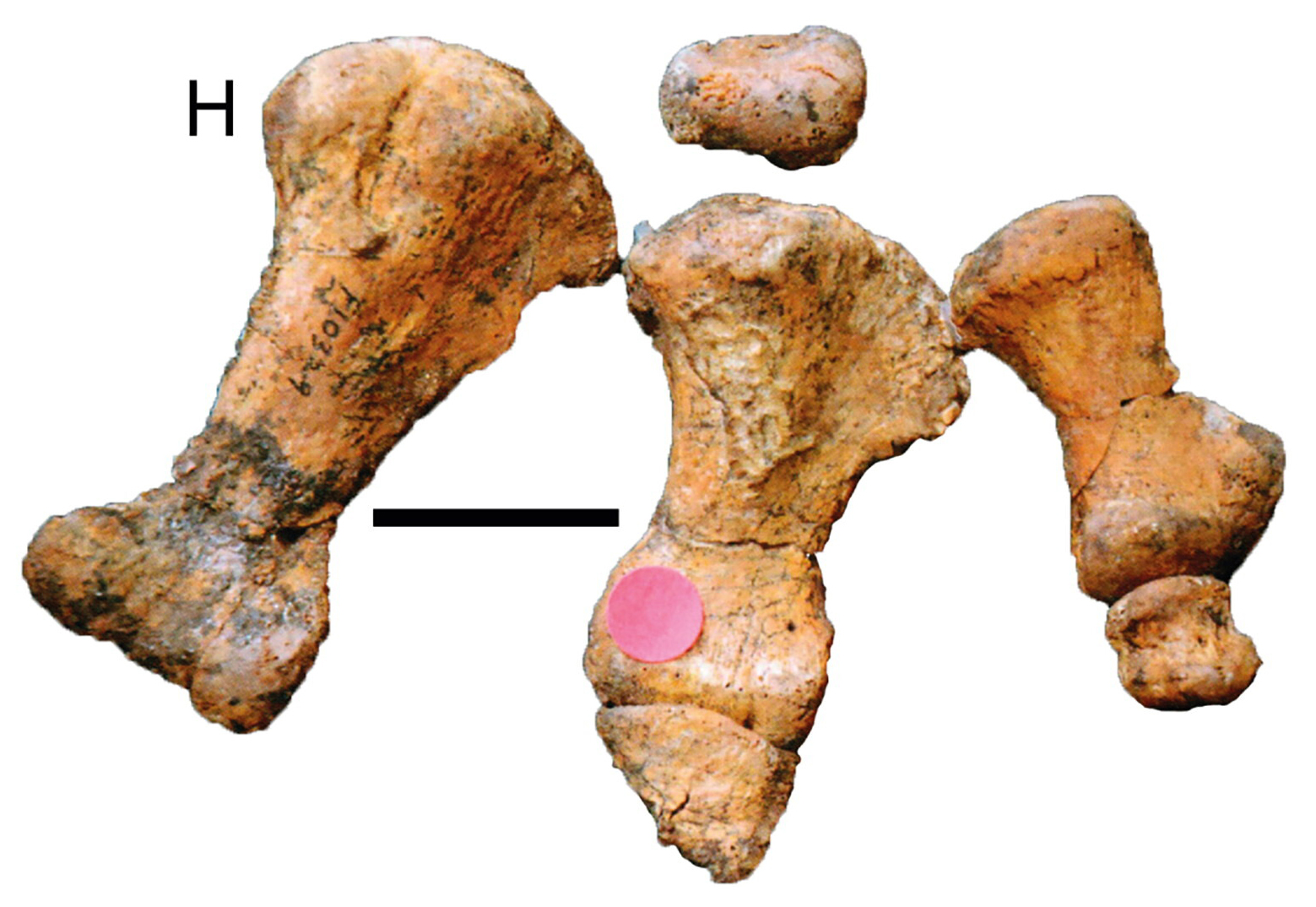
- Left foot of the holotype

Scientific classification
- Kingdom: Animalia
- Phylum: Chordata
- Class: Reptilia
- Clade: Dinosauria
- Clade: †Ornithischia
- Clade: †Thyreophora
- Clade: †Ankylosauria (?)
- Clade: †Parankylosauria
- Genus: †Minmi; Molnar, 1980
- Species: †M. paravertebra

Binomial name
- †Minmi paravertebra Molnar, 1980

= Minmi paravertebra =

Minmi Temporal range: Early Cretaceous ~120–112 Ma

Ankylosaurian dinosaur species from early Cretaceous Period

Minmi is a genus of small herbivorous ankylosaurian dinosaur that lived during the early Cretaceous Period of Australia, about 120 to 112 million years ago.

== Discovery and species ==
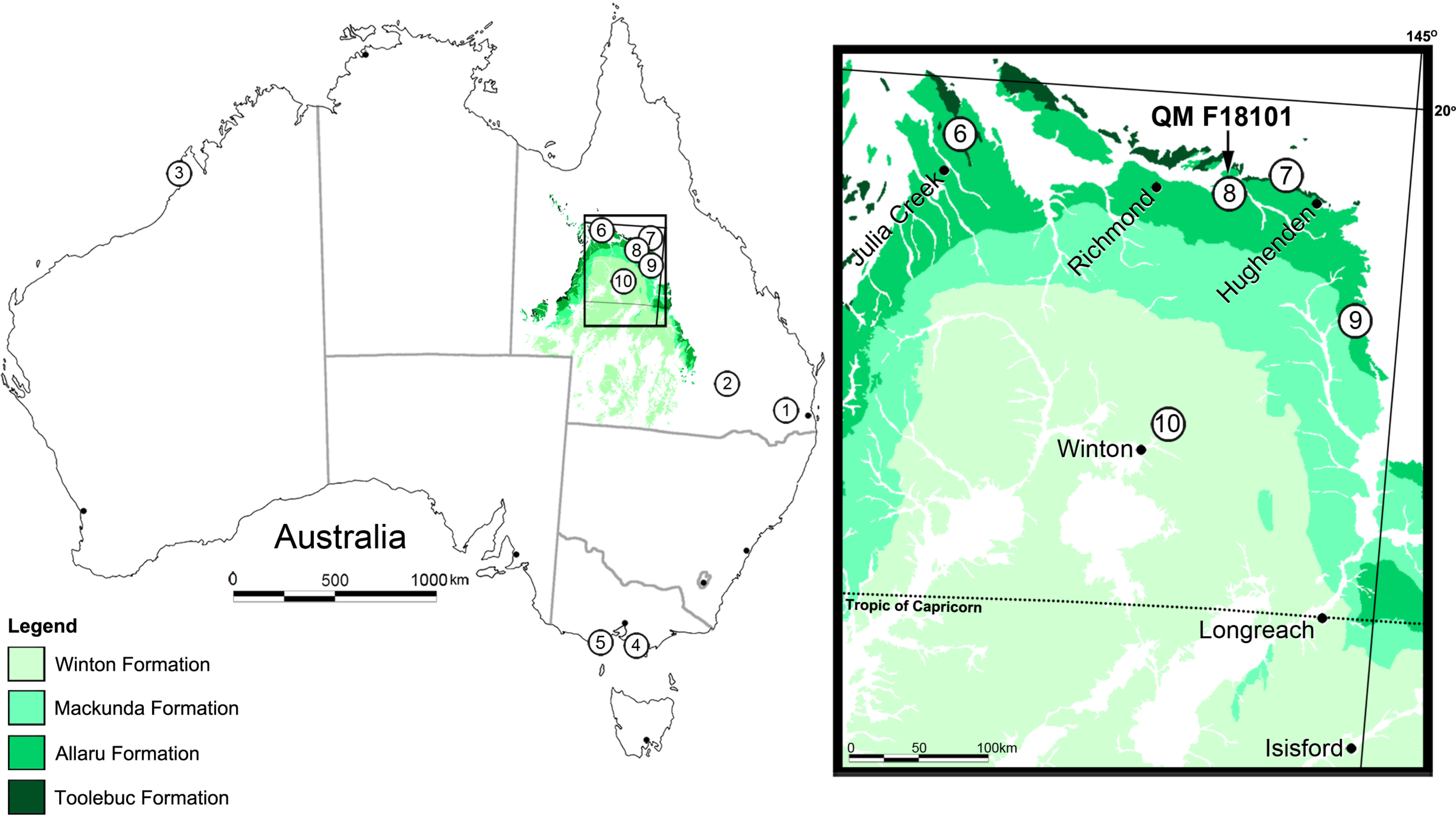
Australian thyreophoran localities: 2 denotes where the holotype was found

In 1964, Dr Alan Bartholomai, a collaborator of the Queensland Museum, discovered a chalkstone nodule containing an ankylosaurian skeleton in Queensland near Minmi Crossing, along the Injun Road, one kilometre south of Mack Gulley, north of Roma.

In 1980, Ralph E. Molnar named and described the type species, in this case the only species known in the genus, Minmi paravertebra. The generic name, at the time the shortest of a Mesozoic dinosaur, refers to Minmi Crossing. The meaning of "minmi" itself is uncertain; it refers to a large lily in the local aboriginal language but might also be derived from min min, a kind of will-o'-the-wisp. The specific name refers to strange bone elements found along the vertebrae, for which Molnar coined the designation paravertebrae.

The holotype, QM F10329, was discovered in a layer of the Bungil Formation, the Minmi Member, a lagoon deposit which was first dated to the Barremian-Valanginian, but later was recalibrated to the Aptian. It consists of a partial skeleton, lacking the skull. It preserves a series of eleven back vertebrae, ribs, a right hindlimb, and plates of the belly armour. It was the first specimen of a thyreophoran discovered in the Southern Hemisphere.

In 1989, a much more complete skeleton was discovered, specimen QM F1801 that includes the skull and shows an articulated body armour. It was referred to a Minmi sp. Since 1989, most information provided on Minmi in books and illustrations is based on this second exemplar, but in 2015, it was named as a separate genus, Kunbarrasaurus.

Between 1989 and 1996, several other specimens were discovered and ultimately referred to a Minmi sp. These include QM F33286: a rump with pelvis and osteoderms; AM F35259: ribs with osteoderms; QM F33565: a partial thighbone; and QM F33566: a partial shinbone, perhaps of the same individual as QM F33565. AM F35259 is part of the collection of the Australian Museum. Later specimen QM F119849 was reported, consisting of ribs and osteoderms.

== Description ==
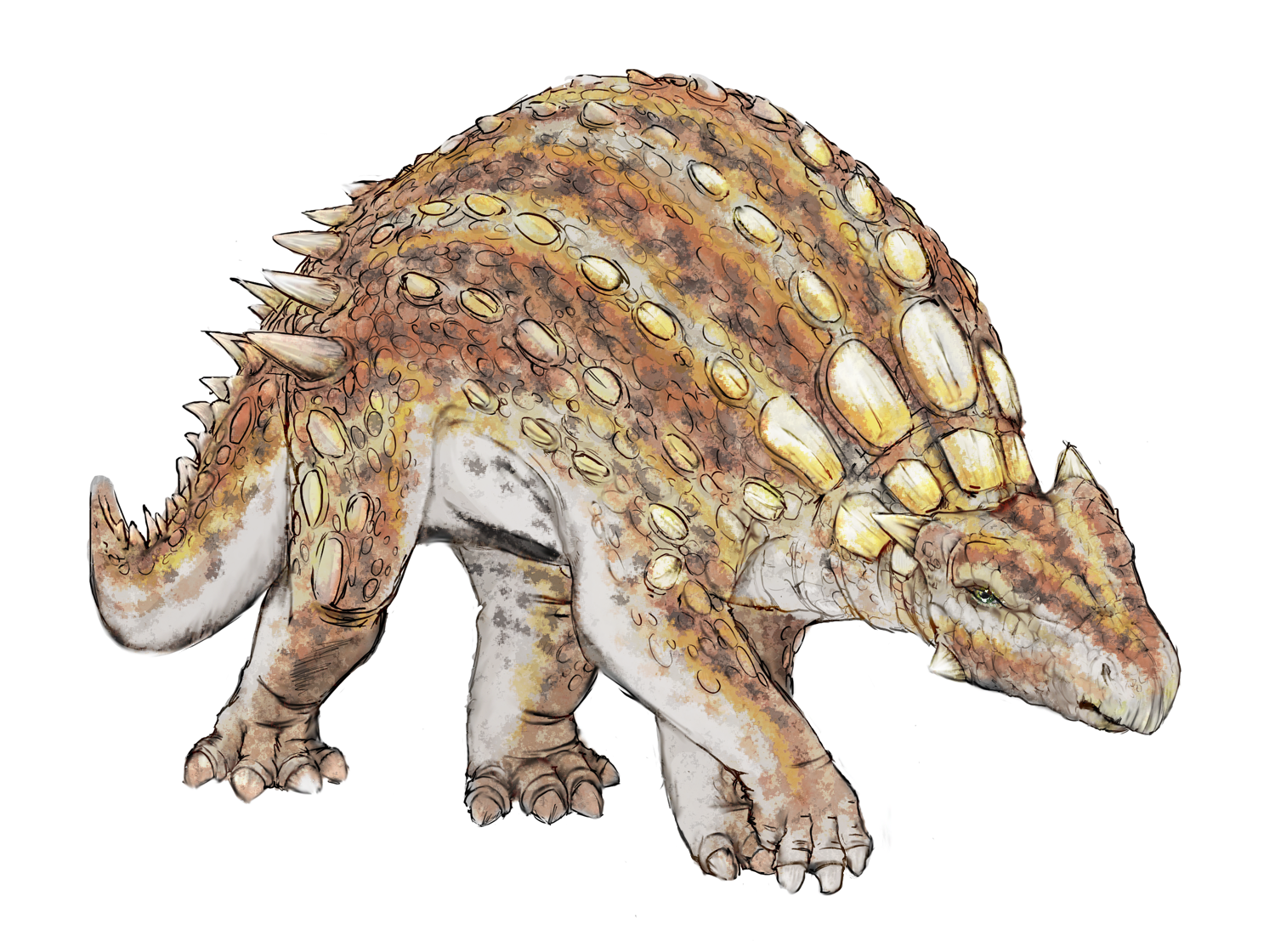
Hypothetical restoration, mainly based on Kunbarrasaurus

Minmi was a small herbivorous quadrupedal armoured ankylosaurian. In 2016, Gregory S. Paul estimated its length at 3 metres (9.8 ft), its weight at 300 kilograms (660 lb). For an ankylosaurian, Minmi had long limbs, perhaps used to quickly search cover under bushes when threatened by large predators which might have been able to flip the small animal on its back.

Unlike other ankylosaurians, Minmi had horizontally oriented plates of bones that ran along the sides of its vertebrae, hence its specific name, paravertebra. Molnar in 1980 acknowledged that these were ossified tendons, but denied that they were homologous to the ossified tendons of other Ornithischia and claimed that they resembled the pathological tendon aponeurosis of modern crocodiles. Victoria Megan Arbour in 2014 deemed this unlikely and could find only one autapomorphy in the holotype: the high vertical extent of the musculus articulospinalis tendon ossification at its outer front end, wrapping itself around the side process of the vertebra. In 2015, Arbour and Philip Currie concluded that even this was not unique, which would mean the holotype had no diagnostic features and Minmi would be a nomen dubium. However, the 2015 description of Kunbarrasaurus announced that new distinguishing traits of Minmi had been discovered and that it should be considered a valid taxon. In 2021, Rozadilla and colleagues argued that Minmi is indeed distinct from its relatives like Struthiosaurus and should be considered a valid taxon.

== Phylogeny ==
In 1980, Molnar placed Minmi in the Ankylosauria. In 1987, he thought it was a member of the Nodosauridae. In 2011, a new cladistic analysis performed by Thompson et al. recovered Minmi as the basalmost known ankylosaurid. Arbour & Currie entered Minmi and Minmi sp. as separate operational taxonomic units in their analysis and recovered Minmi as the basalmost ankylosaurid but Minmi sp. (= Kunbarrasaurus) as a more basal ankylosaurian, too "primitive" to be included in either the Ankylosauridae or Nodosauridae.

A 2023 phylogenetic analysis recovered Minmi as a eurypodan outside Stegosauria and Ankylosauria due to the lack of ankylosaur synapomorphies. A 2024 phylogenetic analysis recovered it as an ankylosaurian of uncertain taxonomic family. A 2026 phylogenetic analysis recovered Minmi as a member of Parankylosauria, a group placed outside of Stegosauria and Ankylosauria.

== Paleobiology and diet ==
A scientific paper published in the year 2000 by Ralph E. Molnar and Harold Trevor Clifford found that Minmi was a low browser and grazer whose diet consisted of plants that grew low to the ground. Its diet consisted of plants such as seeds, fruit, flowering plants, and ferns.

== See also ==
- Timeline of ankylosaur research
