= Pangupterus =

Pangupterus Temporal range: Early Cretaceous, 120 Ma

Scientific classification
- Kingdom: Animalia
- Phylum: Chordata
- Class: Reptilia
- Order: †Pterosauria
- Suborder: †Pterodactyloidea
- Genus: †Pangupterus; Lü et al., 2016
- Species: †P. liui

Binomial name
- †Pangupterus liui Lü et al., 2016

Genus of pterodactyloid pterosaur from the Early Cretaceous

Pangupterus (meaning Pangu wing) is a genus of pterodactyloid pterosaur from the Early Cretaceous Jiufotang Formation of China. It was first described and named by Lü Junchang et al.

It is known from a mostly-complete lower jaw, which bears 36 slender, evenly-spaced, conical teeth jutting out at an angle on its tip. Some teeth are smaller than the others, and appear to be replacement teeth. The teeth had a relatively high density of over 4 per centimetre (10/in), although the spaces between the teeth were wider than the diameter of the teeth themselves. Such teeth are not seen in any other toothed pterosaurs from the Jiufotang Formation with comparable material, and this specialized dental morphology is indicative of a piscivorous lifestyle.

Although no phylogenetic analysis was conducted to determine its affinities, Pangupterus has a small process, called an odontoid, on the end of the maxilla; such a process is also seen in the istiodactylids Longchengpterus and Istiodactylus. In 2022, Chang-Fu Zhou and colleagues identified Pangupterus as a member of the Ctenochasmatidae without comment.
