= Hongshanopterus =

Hongshanopterus Temporal range: Aptian

Scientific classification
- Kingdom: Animalia
- Phylum: Chordata
- Class: Reptilia
- Order: †Pterosauria
- Suborder: †Pterodactyloidea
- Clade: †Lanceodontia
- Clade: †Istiodactyliformes
- Genus: †Hongshanopterus; Wang et al., 2008
- Species: †H. lacustris

Binomial name
- †Hongshanopterus lacustris Wang et al., 2008

Genus of istiodactyliform pterosaur from the Early Cretaceous

Hongshanopterus is a genus of pterodactyloid pterosaur from the Lower Cretaceous Jiufotang Formation of Liaoning, China.

The type species Hongshanopterus lacustris was in 2008 named and described by Wang Xiaolin, Diogenes de Almeida Campos, Zhou Zhonghe and Alexander Wilhelm Armin Kellner. The generic name combines a reference to the Hongshan culture in Liaoning with a Latinised Greek pteron, "wing". The specific name means "of the lake" in Latin, referring to the lake deposits the fossil was found in, at Dapinfang.

Hongshanopterus is based on the holotype IVPP V14582, found in a layer of the Jiufotang Formation dating from the Aptian, It consists of a skull and five neck vertebrae of a single subadult individual.

The wingspan of Hongshanopterus was estimated at 1.8 to 1.9 meters. It possessed a relatively high number of teeth, about thirty-six for both upper jaws combined. The teeth were robust and had triangular crowns which were flattened from mouth side to "lip" side, like those of other istiodactylids. The pterygoid bone had a ridge at the underside, pointing obliquely to the front and the outside.

Hongshanopterus was in 2008 placed in the Istiodactylidae, in a basal position. It was less derived than other istiodactylids by having a tooth row that extended beyond the first third of the skull, and by having some teeth that were directed backwards.

== Classification ==
The cladogram below follows Witton's 2012 analysis:

- - Pterodactylus antiquus
  - - Pteranodon longiceps
    - Coloborhynchus spielbergi
    - Hongshanopterus lacustris
    - Haopterus gracilis
    - Istiodactylidae
      - Nurhachius ignaciobritoi
      - Longchengpterus zhaoi
      - - Istiodactylus latidens
        - Istiodactylus sinensis
        - Liaoxipterus brachyognathus

The cladogram below is a topology recovered by Kellner et al. (2019). In the analyses, they recovered Hongshanopterus as the sister taxon of the family Istiodactylidae, and placed within the more inclusive group Istiodactyliformes.

- Istiodactyliformes
  - Mimodactylidae
    - Haopterus
    - Mimodactylus
  - - Hongshanopterus
    - Istiodactylidae
      - Nurhachius
      - Istiodactylinae
        - Istiodactylus
        - Liaoxipterus

== See also ==
- List of pterosaur genera
- Timeline of pterosaur research
