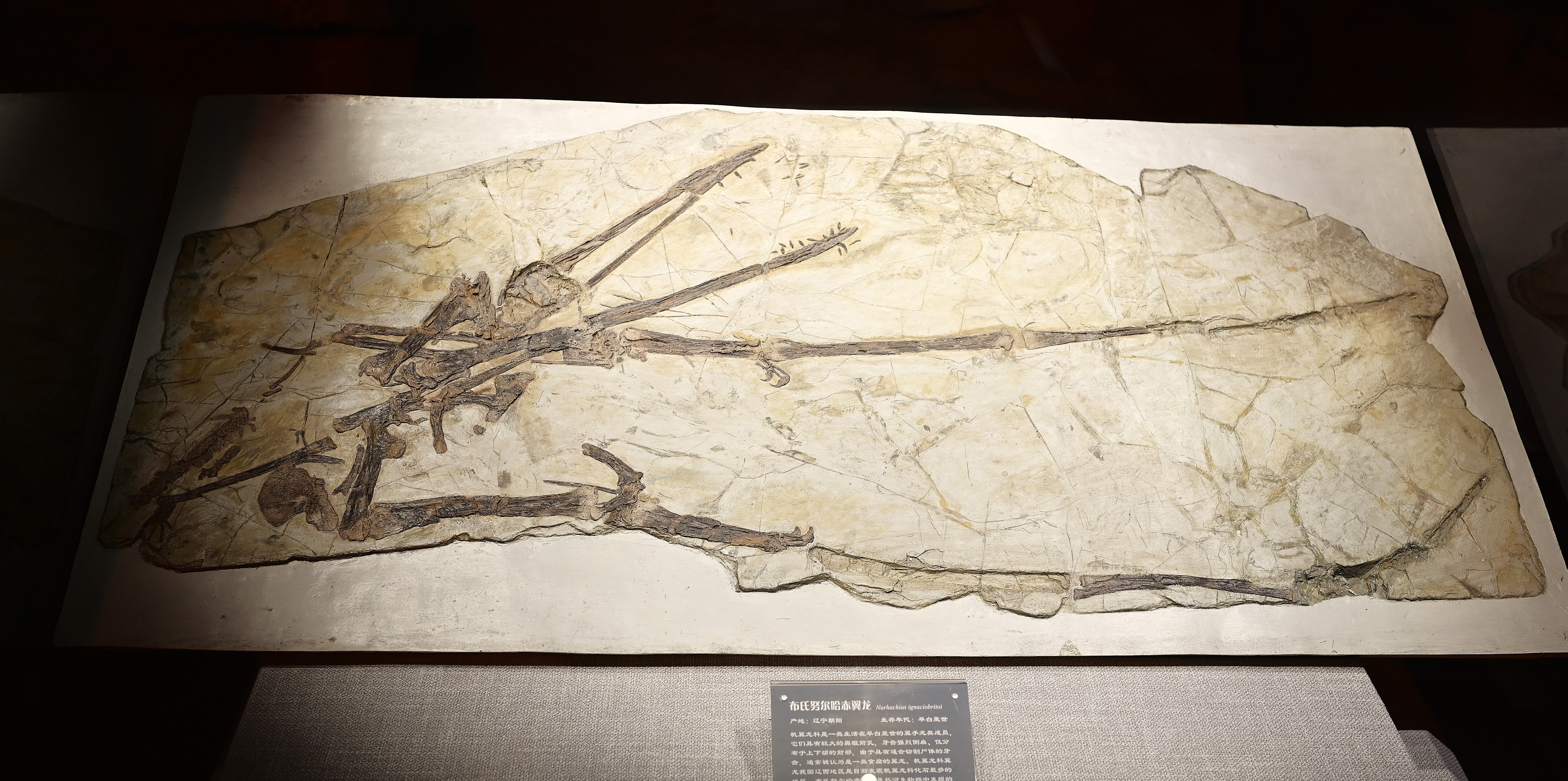
- N. ignaciobritoi holotype specimen

Scientific classification
- Kingdom: Animalia
- Phylum: Chordata
- Class: Reptilia
- Order: †Pterosauria
- Suborder: †Pterodactyloidea
- Family: †Istiodactylidae
- Genus: †Nurhachius; Wang et al., 2005

Type species
- †Nurhachius ignaciobritoi Wang et al., 2005

Other species
- †Nurhachius luei? Zhou et al., 2019

Synonyms
- Longchengpterus zhaoi

= Nurhachius =

Nurhachius Temporal range: Early Cretaceous, 120 Ma

Genus of istiodactylid pterosaur from the Early Cretaceous

Nurhachius is a genus of istiodactylid pterodactyloid pterosaur from the Barremian to Aptian-age Lower Cretaceous Jiufotang Formation of Chaoyang, Liaoning, China. Its fossil remains date back about 120 million years ago.

== Discovery and naming ==
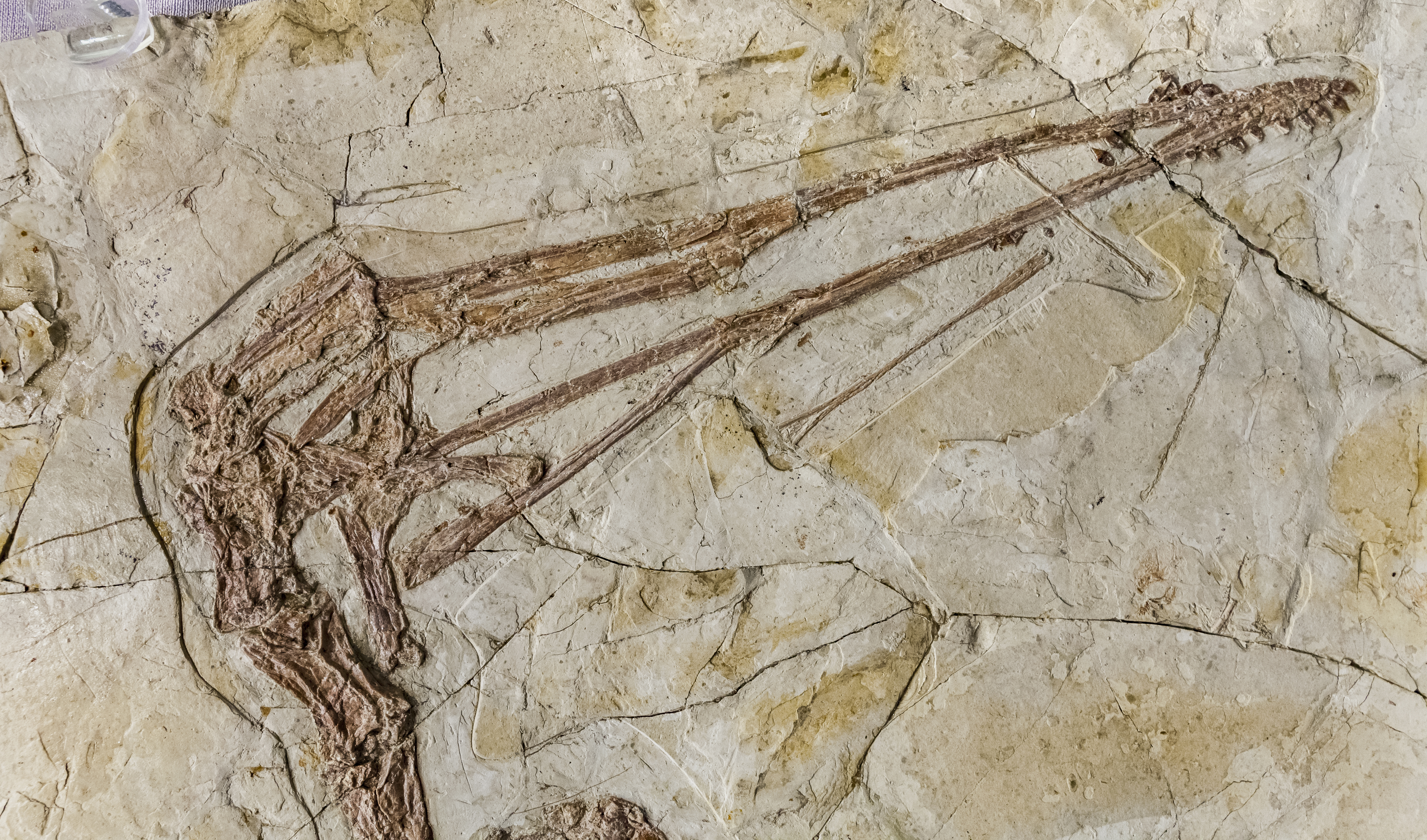
Skull assigned to N. sp.

The genus was named in 2005 by Wang Xiaolin, Alexander Kellner, Zhou Zhonghe and Diogenes de Almeida Campos. The type species is Nurhachius ignaciobritoi. The genus name refers to Nurhaci, the first emperor of the Qing Dynasty, whose original power base encompassed the region where the fossil was found. The specific name honors the late Brazilian paleontologist Ignácio Aureliano Machado Brito, who pioneered the study of pterosaurs in his country.

Nurhachius was first described based on the specimen IVPP V-13288, a partial skull and skeleton. A second specimen, LPM 00023, was later referred to the species.

In 2019, a second species was named: Nurhachius luei. The specific name honors the late Lü Junchang. It is based on the holotype BPMC-0204 from the lower Jiufotang Formation, a skull with lower jaws and seven neck vertebrae.

In 2023, a specimen representing an adult istiodactylid with a 1.6 meter-wingspan was assigned to Nurhachius sp. and described from the Jingangshan Member of the upper part of the Yixian Formation, representing the geologically oldest known record of the genus.

== Description ==
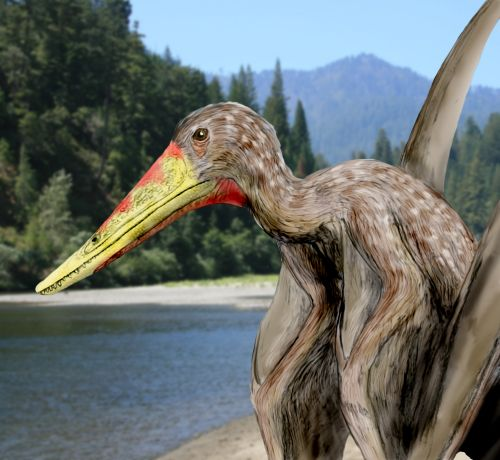
Life restoration of N. ignaciobritoi

The wingspan of Nurhachius was estimated at 2.4 to 2.5 meters (7.9 to 8.2 ft). In 2008, Witton estimated the wingspan at 228 centimeters (7.48 ft), and the weight at 4 kilograms (8.8 lb).

In 2019, a single apomorphy, or unique distinguishing trait of the genus as such, was indicated: the front tip of the palate is slightly turned upwards.

The skull is elongated with in the holotype a preserved length of 315 millimeters (12.4 in) and an estimated total length of about 330 millimeters (13 in). The nasoantorbital fenestra, the large skull opening, is relatively long at 58% of the skull length. The lower jaws have a length of 290 millimeters (11 in). The skull is similar to that of Istiodactylus, which lived at about the same time in what is now England, especially in the teeth that are compressed side to side and the long fenestra. However, it differs from Istiodactylus in several details, including a significantly lower skull, different jugal and a slight curve to the upper margin of the lower jaw. The teeth are curved to the back, have three roots and are robust. They are limited to the anterior ends of the jaws; there are 28 teeth in the upper jaws and 26 in the lower jaws for a total of 54. Most elements of the postcranial skeleton are known, with the exception of some cervical vertebrae, the ribs, the tail and the two most extreme phalanges of the wing finger.

== Classification ==
The describers pointed out several similarities with the Pteranodontoidea and one, the warped deltopectoral crest of the humerus, unique to just the clade Istiodactylus + Anhangueridae. A cladistic analysis performed by Wang and colleagues showed that Nurhachius was a member of the Istiodactylidae. Its position as being closely related to Istiodactylus was supported by a 2008 analysis by Lü Junchang.

In 2008 Lü also suggested that Nurhachius was a junior synonym of another istiodactylid from the same ecosystem, Liaoxipterus. However, a 2012 analysis by Mark Witton found that these two istiodactylids were not identical and, more importantly, did not group together in a phylogenetic tree. Witton also noted that they did not actually group together in Lü's study either.

In 2019, the membership of the Istiodactylidae was confirmed by Zhou and colleagues. In their phylogenetic analysis, both species of Nurhachius (N. ignaciobritoi and N. luei) were recovered within the family Istiodactylidae as sister taxa, and basal members of the family. The cladogram below follows their topology.

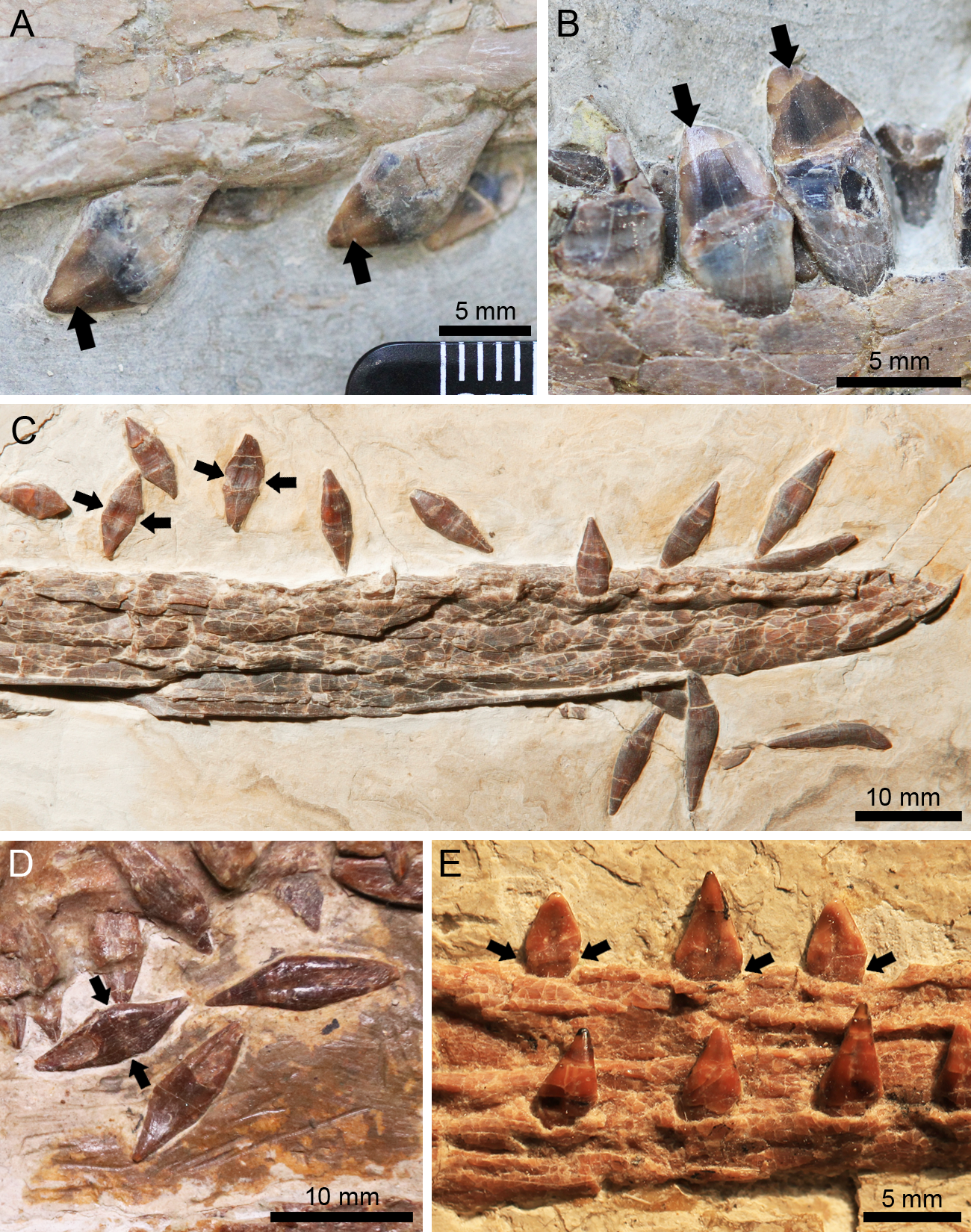
Teeth of Istiodactylus sinensis (A-B), N. ignaciobritoi (C-D) and N. luei (E) from the Jiufotang Formation

- Lanceodontia
  - - - Ikrandraco avatar
      - Lonchodraco giganteus
    - - Haopterus gracilis
      - - Hongshanopterus lacustris
        - Istiodactylidae
          - - Nurhachius ignaciobritoi
            - Nurhachius luei
          - - Liaoxipterus brachyognathus
            - - Istiodactylus sinensis
              - Istiodactylus latidens
  - Ornithocheirae
    - Ornithocheirus simus
    - - Cimoliopterus cuvieri
      - Anhangueria
        - Hamipteridae
        - Anhangueridae

A phylogenetic analysis by Hone et al. (2024) instead recovered the genus to be paraphyletic, with N. luei being closer to Hongshanopterus.

== See also ==
- List of pterosaur genera
- Timeline of pterosaur research
