= Gwawinapterus =

Gwawinapterus Temporal range: Late Cretaceous, 75 Ma

Scientific classification
- Kingdom: Animalia
- Phylum: Chordata
- Class: Actinopterygii
- Order: †Ichthyodectiformes
- Family: †Saurodontidae
- Genus: †Gwawinapterus; Arbour & Currie, 2011
- Species: †G. beardi

Binomial name
- †Gwawinapterus beardi Arbour & Currie, 2011

Extinct genus of ray-finned fishes

Gwawinapterus beardi is a species of saurodontid ray-finned fish from the Late Cretaceous period of British Columbia, Canada. While initially described as a very late-surviving member of the pterosaur family Istiodactylidae, further examination has cast doubt on the identification of the specimen as a pterosaur, and research published in 2012 identified the remains as having come from a saurodontid fish.

== Description ==
Gwawinapterus beardi is known from a single fossil specimen, consisting only of the front half of a skull (upper and lower jaws). The tip of the snout is rounded and deep with a height of about 9.5 centimetres (3.7 in). The tip is about 6.5 centimetres (2.6 in) from the front edge of the largest skull opening, or fenestra. Below this opening the upper jaw is about 21 millimetres (0.83 in) tall. The jaw was originally suggested to be a sutureless fusion of the premaxilla and maxilla of a reptile. Each upper jaw holds at least 26 teeth, eleven or twelve of them below the fenestra; the front of the tooth row has not been preserved and the fossil is broken at its end. The teeth are closely packed. The tooth crowns are small, 4 millimetres (0.16 in) tall and 2.75 millimetres (0.108 in) wide, flattened, and triangular with slightly curved edges. The edges are not serrated, but rounded. The teeth are very straight, showing no curvature to either the back or the middle. The more narrow single tooth roots are relatively long, about 10 to 12 millimetres (0.39 to 0.47 in), for a total tooth length of about 14 millimetres (0.55 in).

The describers have identified two unique derived features (autapomorphies): a number of more than 25 teeth in the upper jaw and a tooth root more than twice as long as the crown.

== Discovery and identification ==
In May 2005, amateur paleontologist Sharon Hubbard found a rock with bones and teeth visible on the surface on a beach near Collishaw Point at Hornby Island, British Columbia, Canada. Accompanying her was Graham Beard, the President of the Vancouver Island Paleontology Museum Society at Qualicum Beach, who added the fossil to its collection. Beard brought the find to the attention of paleontologist Philip J. Currie. He in turn obtained the help of colleague Victoria M. Arbour who identified the specimen as a pterosaur new to science.

In 2011, Arbour and Philip J. Currie described the specimen as the type species of Gwawinapterus beardi. The generic name is derived from Gwa'wina, meaning "raven" in Kwak'wala, the language of the Kwakwaka'wakw, in reference to the similarity of the skull with the stylised raven heads of the hamatsa masks of that tribe, and a Latinised Greek pteron, "wing". The specific name honours Beard.

The rock was sawn in two for better study and its halves, with inventory numbers VIPM 1513a and VIPM 1513b, represent the holotype. It probably originated in marine layers of the Northumberland Formation dating to the late Campanian stage, from about seventy million years ago.

The rock, a calcite nodule, has a length of about 20 centimetres (7.9 in). It holds the snout of the specimen, initially identified as the first pterosaur skull material found in Canada. Some of the surface of the bone is visible; partly it has been preserved as a cross-section or as an imprint. Erupted tooth crowns have disappeared but tooth sockets are still present and due to breakage tooth roots and replacement teeth are visible.

Gwawinapterus was assigned to the Istiodactylidae, using the method of comparative anatomy. By comparison with the skull of the istiodactylid Istiodactylus sinensis, the wingspan of Gwawinapterus has been estimated at three metres. The authors noted that as a pterosaur, it would be the youngest known istiodactylid specimen by forty million years and the only known toothed pterosaur from the Late Cretaceous. This would imply that pterosaur variation had declined less than previously presumed during the Cretaceous period.

However, subsequent research cast doubt on the identification of the specimen as a pterosaur. In a 2012 study of istiodactylid skulls, Mark Witton noted that the Gwawinapterus skull showed a highly unusual pattern of tooth replacement, with new replacement teeth growing directly over older teeth. This aspect of its biology is otherwise unknown in any pterosaur. Witton stated that this "fundamental distinction questions the pterosaurian nature of Gwawinapterus, and may indicate that istiodactylids remain a group exclusively known from the Lower Cretaceous." A more thorough re-examination of the specimen, published in 2012, suggested that the specimen was in fact not a pterosaur but came from a species of saurodontid fish.

== See also ==
- List of pterosaur genera
- Timeline of pterosaur research
