= Archaeoistiodactylus =

Archaeoistiodactylus Temporal range: Middle Jurassic, 165 Ma

Scientific classification
- Kingdom: Animalia
- Phylum: Chordata
- Class: Reptilia
- Order: †Pterosauria
- Clade: †Monofenestrata
- Genus: †Archaeoistiodactylus; Lü & Fucha, 2010

Type species
- †Archaeoistiodactylus linglongtaensis Lü & Fucha, 2010

Genus of monofenestratan pterosaur from the Middle Jurassic

Archaeoistiodactylus is an extinct genus of wukongopterid pterosaur from the Middle Jurassic of China.

== Discovery and naming ==
Archaeoistiodactylus is known from an incomplete skeleton with a partial skull and lower jaws. Catalogued as holotype specimen JPM04-0008, it was recovered from rocks of the Tiaojishan Formation in western Liaoning, China, which date to the Bathonian-Callovian stages of the Jurassic period. Apart from the skull, it preserves ribs, parts of the wings, hindlimbs and the pelvis. The neck, tail and feet of the specimen are lacking.

Archaeoistiodactylus was first named and described by Lü Junchang and Fucha Xiaohui in 2010. The type species is Archaeoistiodactylus linglongtaensis. The generic name is a combination of the Greek archaios, "ancient", with the name of the genus Istiodactylus, referring to Archaeoistiodactylus being presumed to have been an older close relative of the latter. The specific name refers to the provenance near Linglongta.

== Description ==
The front teeth in the upper jaw of Archaeoistiodactylus are angled backward. In the hand, the metacarpal bones are short.

== Classification ==
Lü and Fucha assigned Archaeoistiodactylus to the clade Breviquartossa and considered it to be more closely related to the istiodactylids than to any other group of pterosaurs; however, they considered it to be more primitive than the Cretaceous istiodactylids and regarded it as an ancestor, rather than member of istiodactylid pterosaurs. David Martill and Steve Etches in 2013 suggested that the holotype specimen might actually be a poorly preserved specimen of Darwinopterus. In 2014, Corwin Sullivan and colleagues considered the "distinctive midline tooth in the tip of the rostrum" of the holotype specimen to be a probable valid diagnostic feature of A. linglongtaensis; however, the authors considered it more likely that Archaeoistiodactylus was a basal monofenestratan than an istiodactylid. Later, when included in a phylogenetic analysis, Archaeoistiodactylus fell in a polytomy with wukongopterids, providing further support for an affinity with the clade. The 2021 description of Kunpengopterus antipollicatus followed this classification, but considered Archaeoistiodactylus to be an undiagnostic wukongopterid.

== See also ==
- Timeline of pterosaur research
