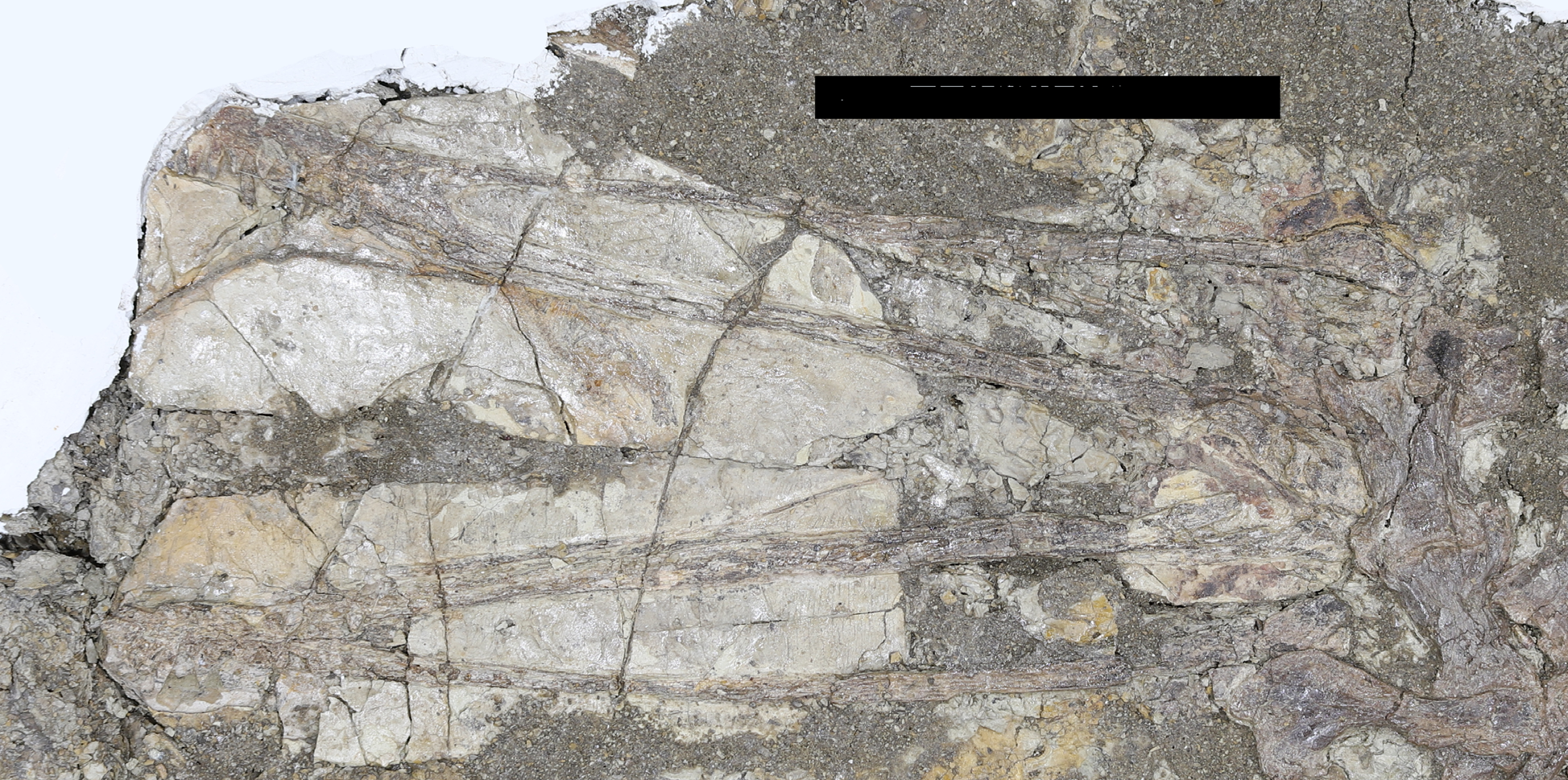
- Holotype snout (left, light-colored slab)

Scientific classification
- Kingdom: Animalia
- Phylum: Chordata
- Class: Reptilia
- Order: †Pterosauria
- Suborder: †Pterodactyloidea
- Family: †Istiodactylidae
- Genus: †Luchibang; Hone et al., 2020
- Species: †L. xingzhe

Binomial name
- †Luchibang xingzhe Hone et al., 2020

Synonyms
- Luchibang xinzhe (sic)

= Luchibang =

Luchibang Temporal range: Early Cretaceous, 130–122 Ma

Genus of istiodactylid pterosaur

Luchibang (meaning "Lü's heron wing") is an extinct genus of istiodactylid pterosaur discovered in Inner Mongolia, China. The type and only species is Luchibang xingzhe. The genus was initially established on the basis of a supposed nearly complete skeleton and skull, although later analysis of the specimen revealed that it represents a chimera, with the Luchibang holotype restricted to the end of the snout.

== Discovery and naming ==
The Luchibang holotype was acquired from fossil dealers who found it before 2000, possibly near the village of Liutiaogou, in Dashuangmiao of Ningcheng, Inner-Mongolia. Around 2009, David Hone was asked by Xu Xing to describe the specimen, but the article's publication was delayed for many years due to doubts expressed during peer review regarding its authenticity. Luchibang was announced in an abstract of the Los Angeles Flugsaurier conference in 2018, but it was only validly published in 2020.

In 2020, David W. E. Hone, Adam J. Fitch, Ma Feimin, and Xu Xing named and described the type species Luchibang xingzhe. The generic name Luchibang is derived from the Mandarin lu, meaning "heron", and chibang, meaning "wing", and is also a reference to the late paleontologist Lü Junchang. The specific name xingzhe means "walker", in reference to its terrestrial capabilities.

In 2020, Hone et al. initially used the accidental misspelling "xinzhe" once for the specific name. However, the proper spelling "xingzhe" is used in the remainder of the publication. One figure and the supplemental data also contain the name "Luchibang wuke". A corrigendum to the paper clarifies that the spelling xinzhe was in error, and that wuke was the original planned name but lacks a description and is therefore a nomen nudum. Hone et al. formally changed the species name from xinzhe to the intended xingzhe.

The Luchibang holotype specimen, ELDM 1000, is assumed to have been found in a layer of the Jehol Group possibly dating to the Aptian. It was originally interpreted as consisting of a nearly complete skeleton with skull, compressed on a single plate. Of the observable fossil material, only the rear of the skull, the front two neck vertebrae, the sternal ribs, the tail, a prepubis, the left wrist, and left pteroid are lacking. Pieces of skin are preserved. The skeleton is largely articulated and visible from the underside. The body represents a juvenile individual, and is part of the collection of the Erlianhaote Dinosaur Museum.

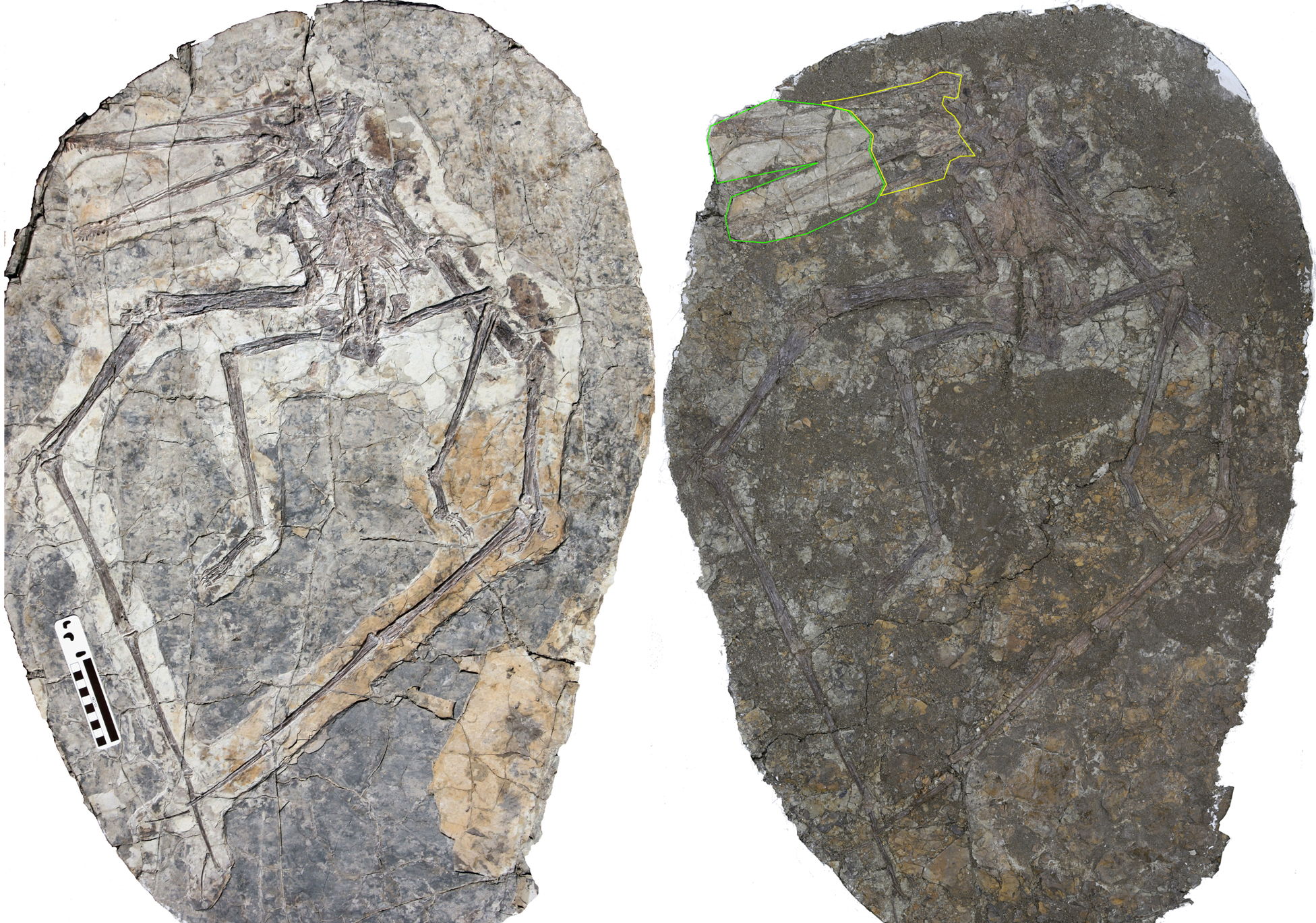
Chimeric Luchibang skeleton before (left) and after (right) flood damage, with the holotype snout outlined in green and potentially problematic regions in yellow

The fossil had been prepared by fossil traders prior to its acquisition by the museum. Due to differences in colouration and the fact that the proportions of the postcrania, especially the long legs and large feet, resemble those of Azhdarchoidea, it was suggested in the peer review that the piece might be a chimera, the head having been added to the rest of the body to increase its value. To check this, Hone and C. Rodgers further prepared the head region but could find no trace of connecting glue. The head seemed to have been an integral part of the piece and therefore was initially concluded to be authentic. However, in 2024, Hone et al., reassessed the type specimen following damage from a flood, and found it to be chimeric. They restricted the Luchibang holotype to the rostrum portion of the specimen, as only it can still be confidently referred to the Istiodactylidae, and maintained it as still representing a valid distinct genus. The postcranial material instead likely belongs to an indeterminate member of Azhdarchomorpha, possibly the tapejaroid Sinopterus.

== Description ==
The chimeric body with which the holotype skull is associated has an estimated wingspan of 2 metres (6.6 ft). Hone et al. (2020) interpreted this as indicative of a considerably larger adult size, making Luchibang a notably large istiodactylid. However, this immature individual belongs to a species distinct from Luchibang, possibly a pterosaur related to Sinopterus. The skull material cannot be referred to a juvenile and likely belongs to an animal with a wingspan around 3 metres (9.8 ft).

Hone et al. (2020) indicated some distinguishing traits of the purported holotype individual, including two alleged autapomorphies (unique derived characters). The sternum is large and rectangular with a straight rear edge, and the femur equals more than 80% of the ulna length. However, these are no longer relevant as the chimeric holotype is restricted to the partial skull. Regardless, the unique combination of cranial features allows Luchibang to be regarded as a distinct genus. These include widely spaced teeth in the rear of the jaw, a dentary symphysis four times longer than wide in top view, and narrow, long branches of the lower jaw, twenty times longer than wide in top view.

== Palaeobiology ==
Two specimens of the fish Lycoptera were found in association with the Luchibang composite skeleton; the first, resting between the holotype jaws, likely represents an animal that died around the same time, while the second was found within or underneath the ribcage of the non-Luchibang added specimen, and may represent its gut contents. However, the association of the body and skull cannot be proven, and may not be derived from necessarily coeval animals.
