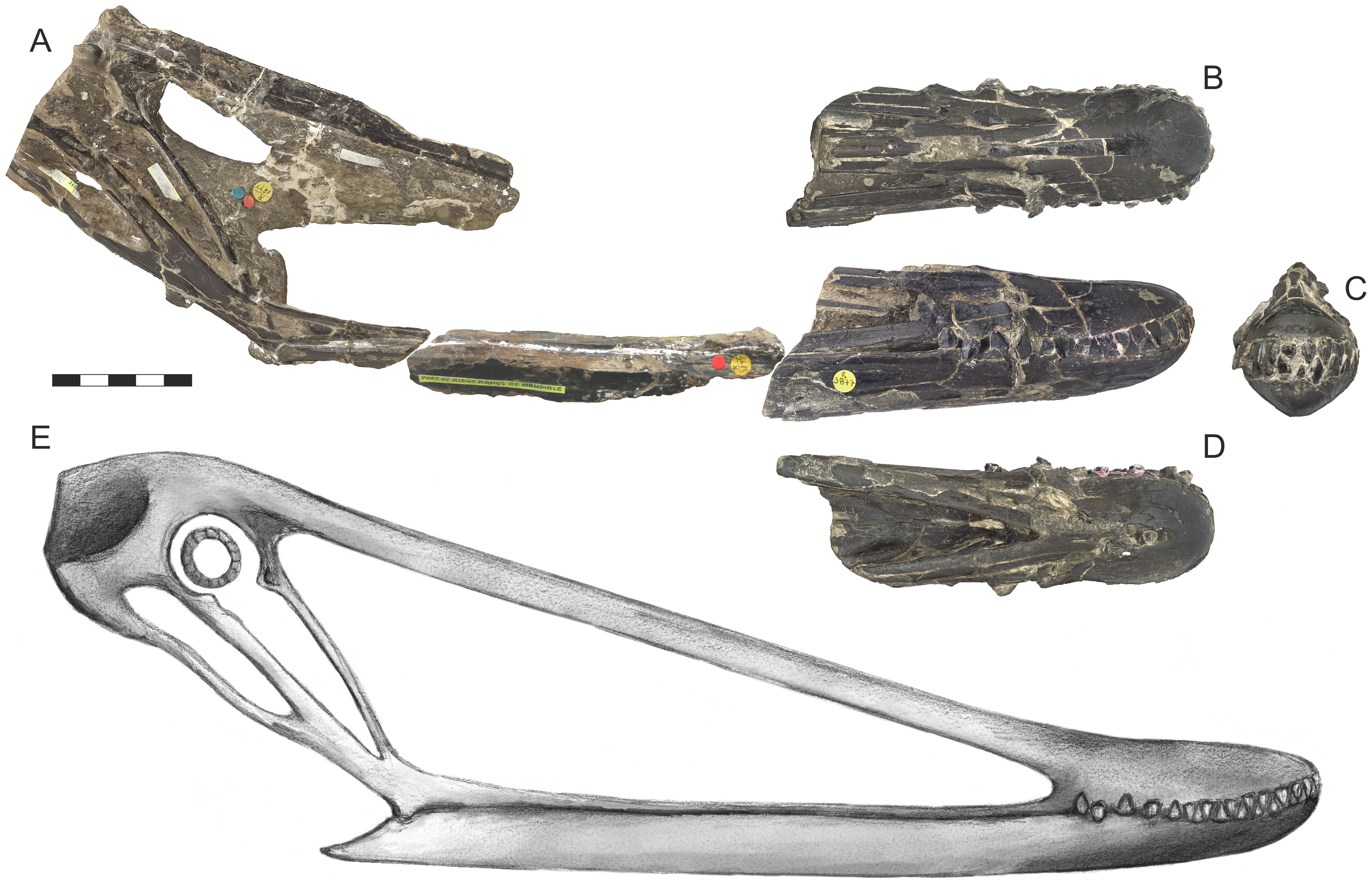
- Skull fragments of specimen NHMUK R3877, and Witton's 2012 reconstruction of the complete skull

Scientific classification
- Kingdom: Animalia
- Phylum: Chordata
- Class: Reptilia
- Order: †Pterosauria
- Suborder: †Pterodactyloidea
- Family: †Istiodactylidae
- Subfamily: †Istiodactylinae
- Genus: †Istiodactylus; Howse, Milner, & Martill, 2001

Type species
- †Ornithodesmus latidens Seeley, 1901

Species
- †I. latidens (Seeley, 1901); †I. sinensis Andres & Ji, 2006

Synonyms
- Ornithodesmus latidens Seeley, 1901

= Istiodactylus =

Istiodactylus Temporal range: Early Cretaceous, 125–120 Ma

Genus of istiodactylid pterosaur from the Early Cretaceous

Istiodactylus is a genus of pterosaur that lived during the Early Cretaceous period, about 120 million years ago. The first fossil was discovered on the English Isle of Wight in 1887, and in 1901 became the holotype specimen of a new species, O. latidens (Latin for "wide tooth"), in the genus Ornithodesmus. This species was moved to its own genus, Istiodactylus, in 2001; this name is Greek for "sail finger". More specimens were described in 1913, and Istiodactylus was the only pterosaur known from three-dimensionally preserved fossils for much of the 20th century. In 2006, a species from China, I. sinensis, was assigned to Istiodactylus, but it has also been suggested to belong to a different genus.

Istiodactylus was a large pterosaur; estimates of its wingspan range from 4.3 to 5 metres (14 to 16 ft). Its skull was about 45 centimetres (18 in) long, and was relatively short and broad for a pterosaur. The front of the snout was low and blunt, and bore a semicircle of 48 teeth. The triangular teeth were closely spaced, interlocked, and formed a "razor-edged" outline. The lower jaw also had a tooth-like projection that occluded with the teeth. The skull had a very large naso-antorbital opening (which combined the antorbital fenestra and the opening for the bony nostril) and a slender eye socket. Some of the vertebrae were fused into a notarium, to which the shoulder blades connected. It had very large forelimbs, with a wing-membrane distended by a long wing-finger, but the hindlimbs were very short.

Until the 21st century, Istiodactylus was the only known pterosaur of its kind, and was placed in its own family, Istiodactylidae, within the group Ornithocheiroidea. Istiodactylus differed from other istiodactylids in having a proportionally shorter skull. The distinctive teeth of Istiodactylus indicate that it was a scavenger that may have used its teeth to sever morsels from large carcasses in the manner of a cookie cutter. The wings of Istiodactylus may have been adapted for soaring, which would have helped it find carcasses before terrestrial carnivores. Istiodactylus is known from the Wessex Formation and the younger Vectis Formation, which represent river and coastal environments that were shared with various pterosaurs, dinosaurs, and other animals.

== History of discovery ==
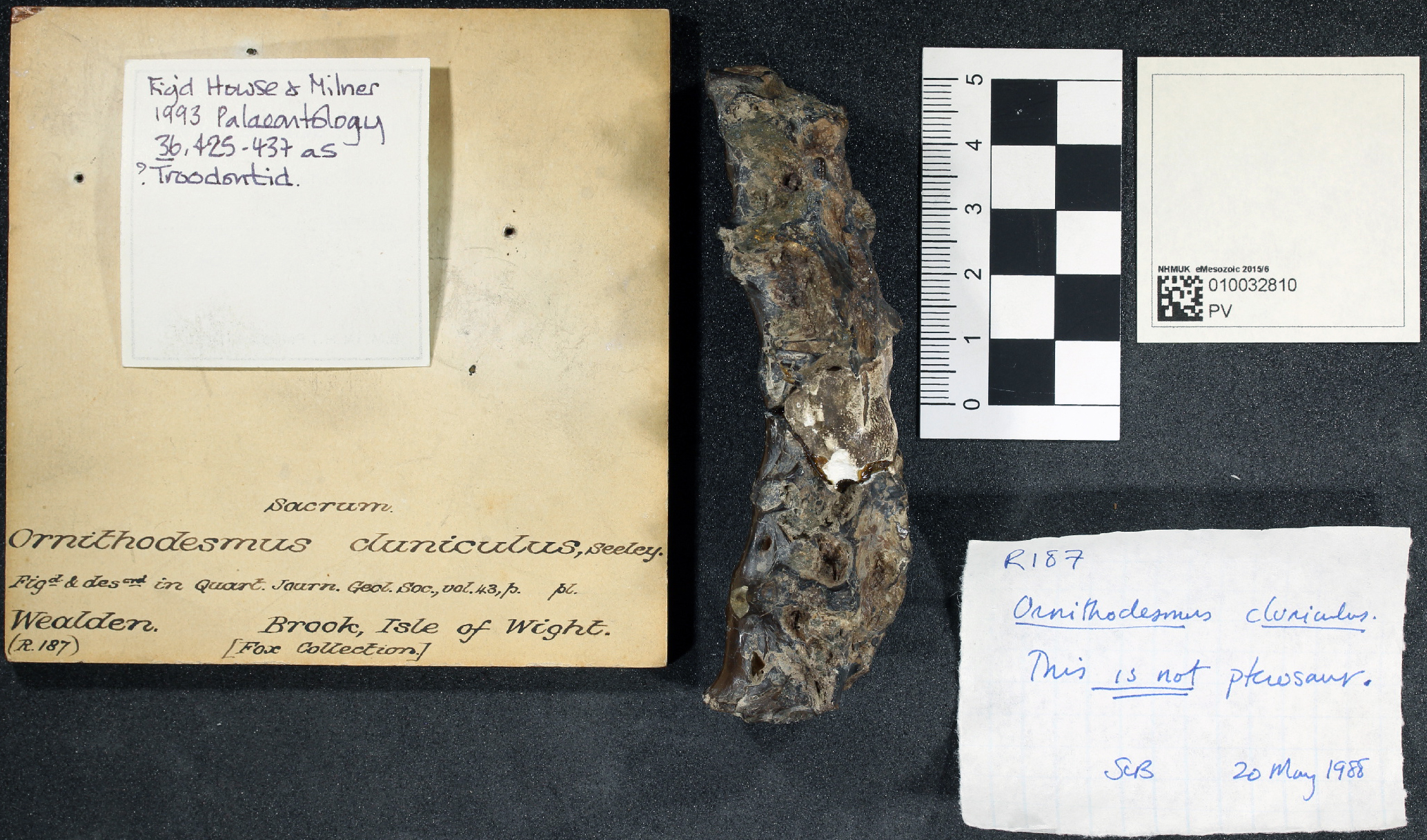
Holotype specimen of Ornithodesmus cluniculus, a synsacrum now known to have belonged to a dinosaur; it was originally thought to belong to a bird in 1887, and later a pterosaur when O. latidens was assigned to the genus in 1901

In 1887, the British palaeontologist Harry G. Seeley described a fossil synsacrum (fused vertebrae attached to the pelvis) from the Wessex Formation of the Isle of Wight, an island off the coast of southern England. Though he compared it with those of dinosaurs and pterosaurs, he concluded that it belonged to a bird (though more dinosaur-like than any known bird), which he named as the new genus and species Ornithodesmus cluniculus. The British geologist John W. Hulke suggested later that year that Ornithodesmus was a pterosaur, finding it similar to fossils that he had seen before, but Seeley disagreed.

In his 1901 Dragons of the Air, the first popular book about pterosaurs, Seeley reported another specimen (NHMUK R176 at the Natural History Museum in London, formerly BMNH), found by the Reverend William Fox in Atherfield on the Isle of Wight, and acquired by the British Museum in 1882. Specimen NHMUK R176 had been assigned to the species Ornithocheirus nobilis by the English naturalist Richard Lydekker in 1888, but Seeley considered it another species of the genus Ornithodesmus, which he now considered pterosaurian. Seeley named the new species O. latidens; latus is Latin for "wide" and dens means "tooth", a name originally used by Fox and his friends. Seeley presumably assigned the new species to the existing genus due to similarities between their sacra, but with little explanation.

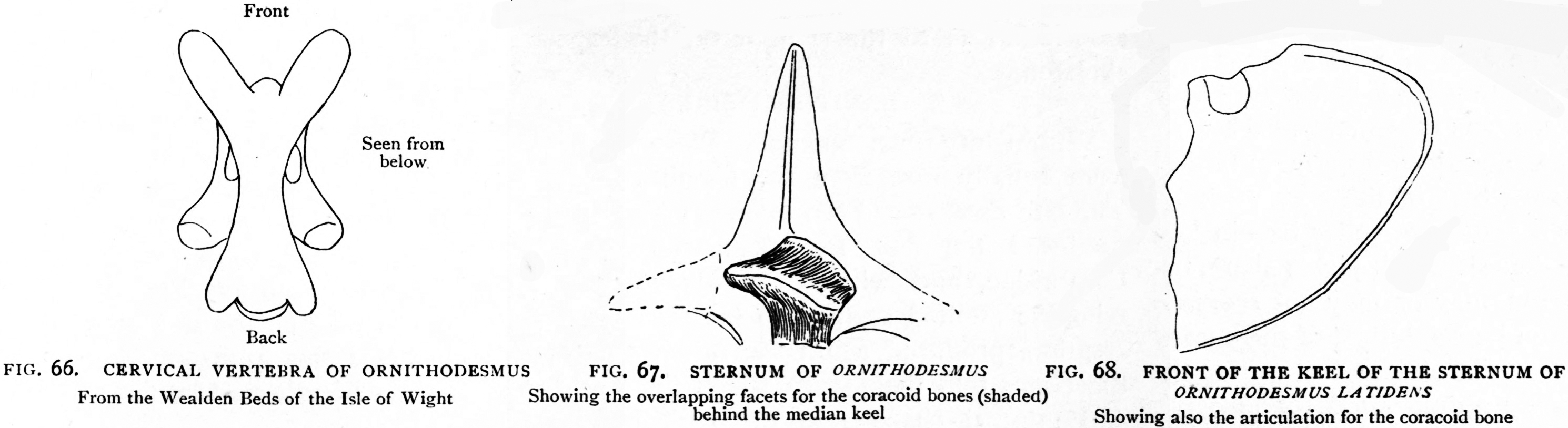
Neck vertebra and sternal elements of the holotype specimen (NHMUK R176) of I. latidens, as shown by Seeley in 1901

Specimen NHMUK R176 is a poorly preserved skeleton consisting of the back of the skull, a neck vertebra, the sternum, the sacrum, the right humerus, the notarium, the left humerus, part of the radius and ulna, carpals, metacarpals, and wing phalanx bones. Though Seeley did not designate a holotype specimen for O. latidens, he described and illustrated parts of NHMUK R176, which makes the 1901 naming valid according to the International Commission on Zoological Nomenclature, and the specimen is considered the holotype today. Later researchers have been mystified by the fact that Seeley described the jaws and teeth of O. latidens and named it after the latter, when the only specimen available in 1901, NHMUK R176, does not appear to have had these elements. Only the back of the skull was listed as present by Lydekker in 1888, but it was rumoured that a set of jaws had been lost from Fox's collection, so it is possible that Seeley had examined them prior to this.

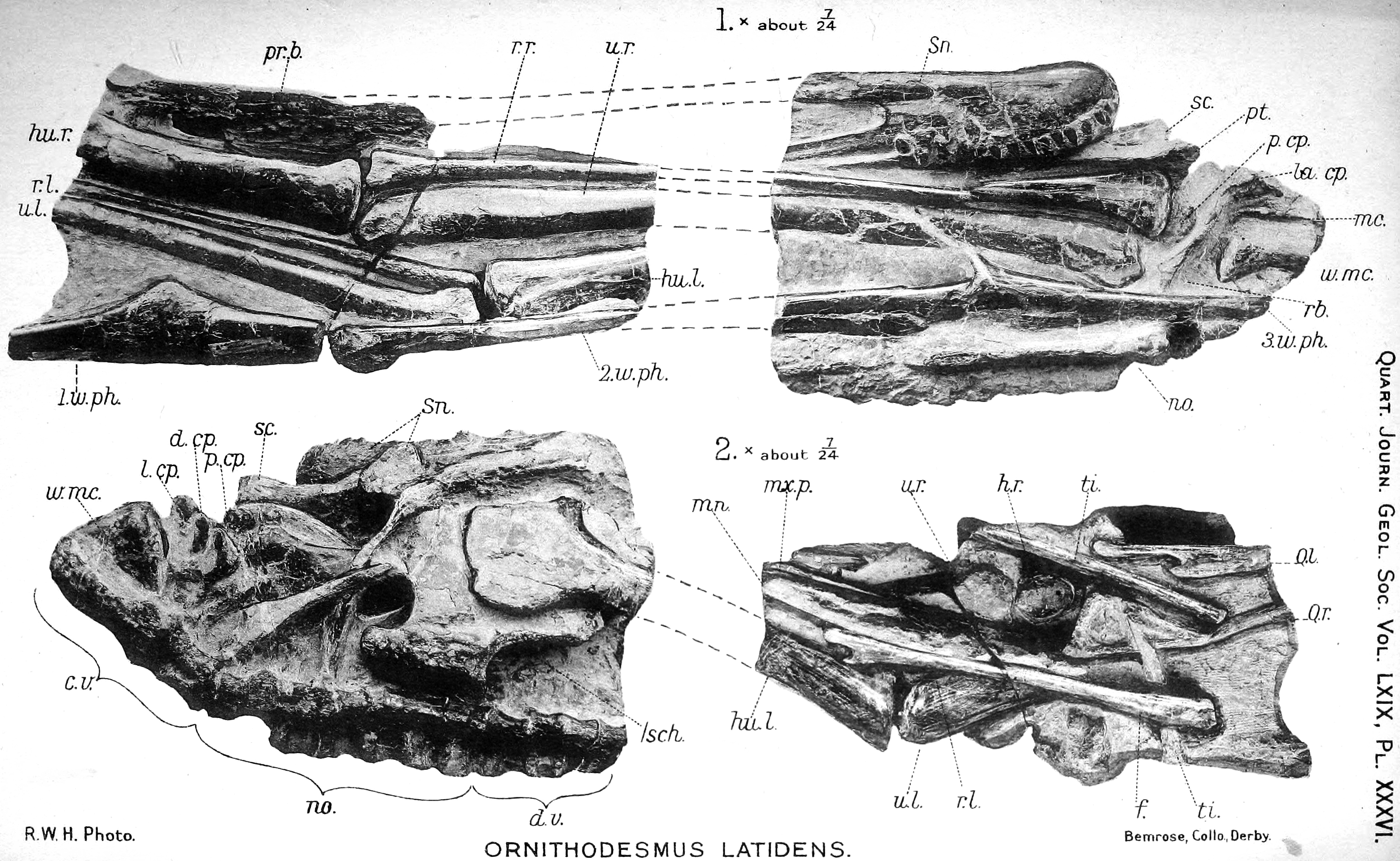
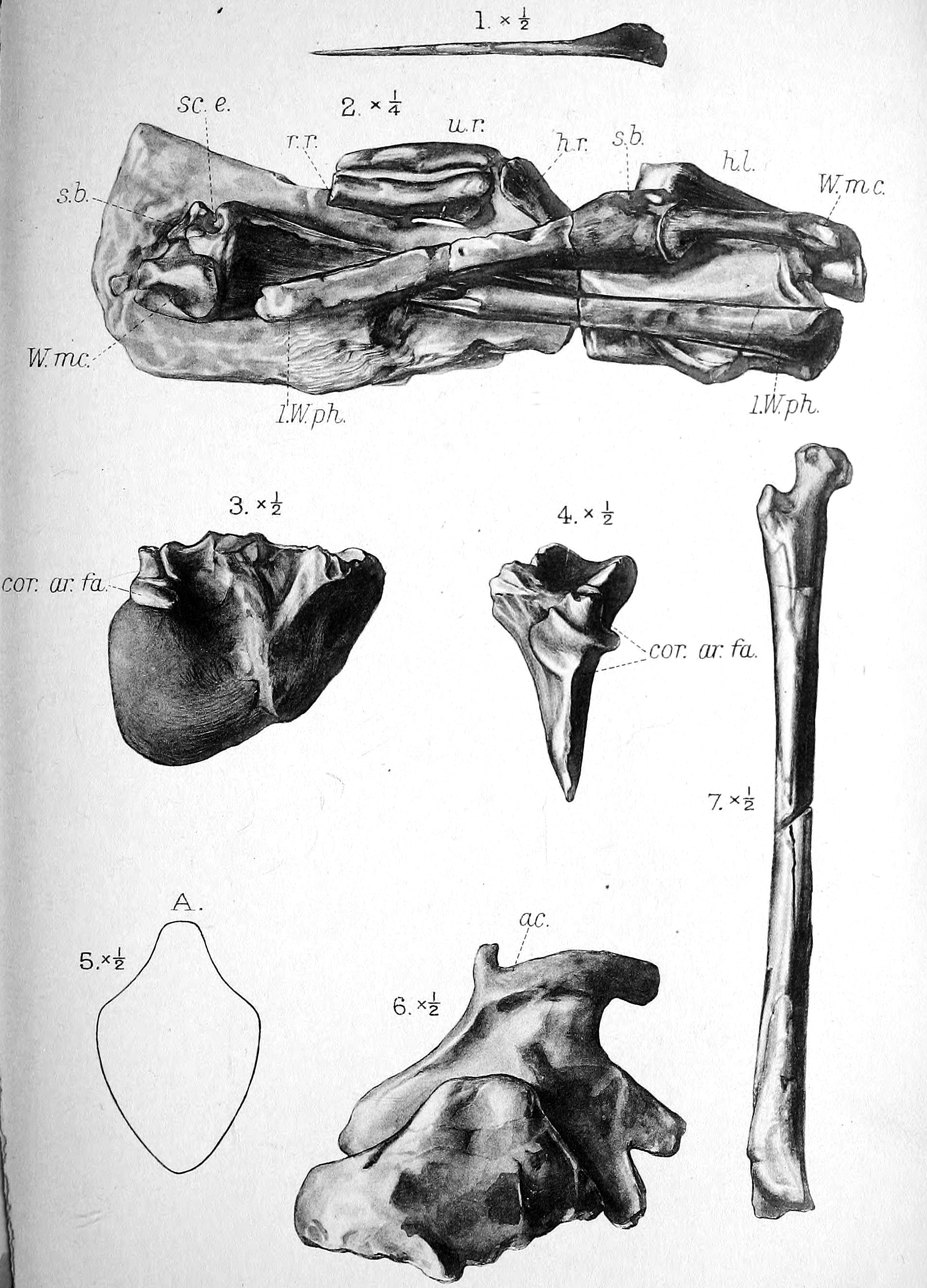
Blocks of specimen NHMUK R3877 and NHMUK R3878 photographed before full preparation, with limb-bones, sternum and ischium of NHMUK R3877 (lower right)

In 1913, the British amateur palaeontologist Reginald W. Hooley described two more specimens of O. latidens, collected from the sea after a rockfall near Atherfield Point on the Isle of Wight in 1904, originating from the Vectis Formation. The first of these, NHMUK R3877, was collected as three blocks and consists of a skull, neck and trunk vertebrae, a shoulder blade, an ischium, and parts of the forelimbs. The second specimen, NHMUK R3878, was collected in one block, and includes parts of the pectoral girdle and forelimbs. These specimens represent the most complete remains of Cretaceous pterosaurs found in England, and NHMUK R3877 was one of the only known three-dimensionally preserved pterosaur skeletons for much of the 20th century (pterosaur bones are often flattened compression fossils). Hooley discussed O. latidens in detail, and placed the genus Ornithodesmus in its own family, Ornithodesmidae. His article ended with a discussion wherein it was noted that the palaeontologist Charles William Andrews had expressed doubts as to whether O. latidens belonged in the genus Ornithodesmus, as the vertebrae of the specimen that genus was based on differed markedly from those of Hooley's specimen. The American palaeontologist Samuel W. Williston subsequently reviewed Hooley's article, disagreeing with some of his conclusions about the anatomy and classification of the animal. After Hooley's monograph, little was written about the animal for the rest of the 20th century, and no similar pterosaurs were found for decades.

=== New genus and assigned species ===
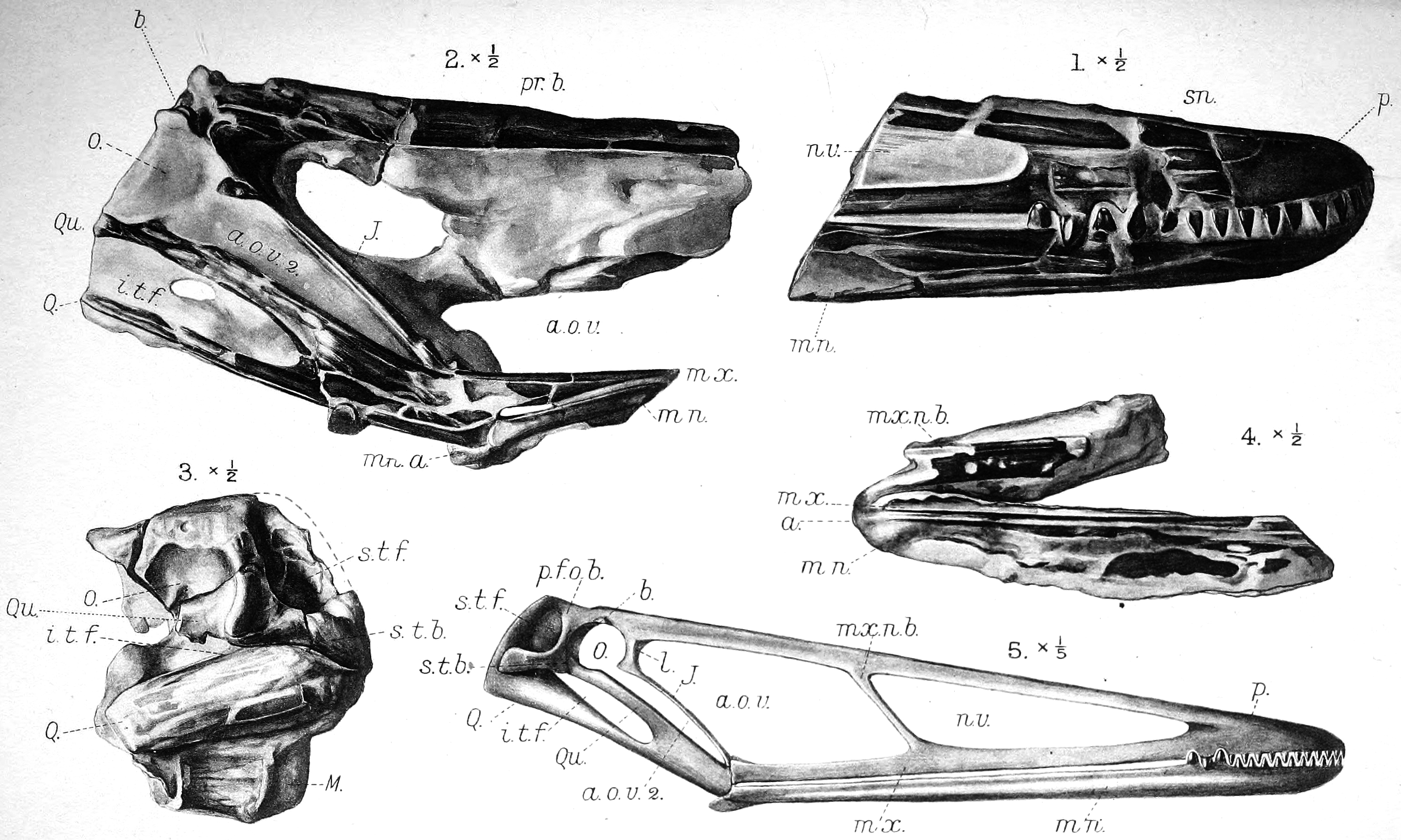
Skull elements of NHMUK R3877 and R176, with Hooley's 1913 long-jawed skull reconstruction

In 1993, the British palaeontologists Stafford C. Howse and Andrew C. Milner concluded that the holotype sacrum and only specimen of O. cluniculus did not belong to a pterosaur, but to a maniraptoran dinosaur (this conclusion had also been reached independently by the British palaeontologist Christopher Bennett). They pointed out that no detailed attempts had been made to compare the sacrum of O. cluniculus with those of pterosaurs, and that O. latidens had in effect been treated as the type species of the genus Ornithodesmus, with one writer even treating the original species as a synonym of the newer. As a definite species of pterosaurs, "O." latidens therefore required a new genus name. In 2001, Howse, Milner, and David Martill moved "O." latidens to the new genus Istiodactylus; the name is derived from Greek istion, "sail" and daktylos, "finger", referring to the wings of large pterosaurs. They also named the new family Istiodactylidae, with Istiodactylus as the sole member.

Additional Istiodactylus specimens were later found on the Isle of Wight, including IWCMS 2003.40, a dentary fragment that may belong to a juvenile, and isolated teeth found through screen washing from 2002 and onwards. During the early 21st century, new types of istiodactylids were reported from China. In 2006, Brian Andres and Ji Qiang named a second species of Istiodactylus, I. sinensis, from the Jiufotang Formation of China (from Greek sino, pertaining to China), based on a partial skeleton. They found it very similar to I. latidens, though much smaller, with a wingspan of 2.7 metres (8.9 ft), and more teeth. In 2006, Lü Junchang and colleagues concluded that I. sinensis was a junior synonym of the istiodactylid Nurhachius ignaciobritoi from the same formation. In 2008, Lü and colleagues instead found Longchengpterus zhaoi to be the sister species of I. sinensis, and suggested that these two may belong to the same species.

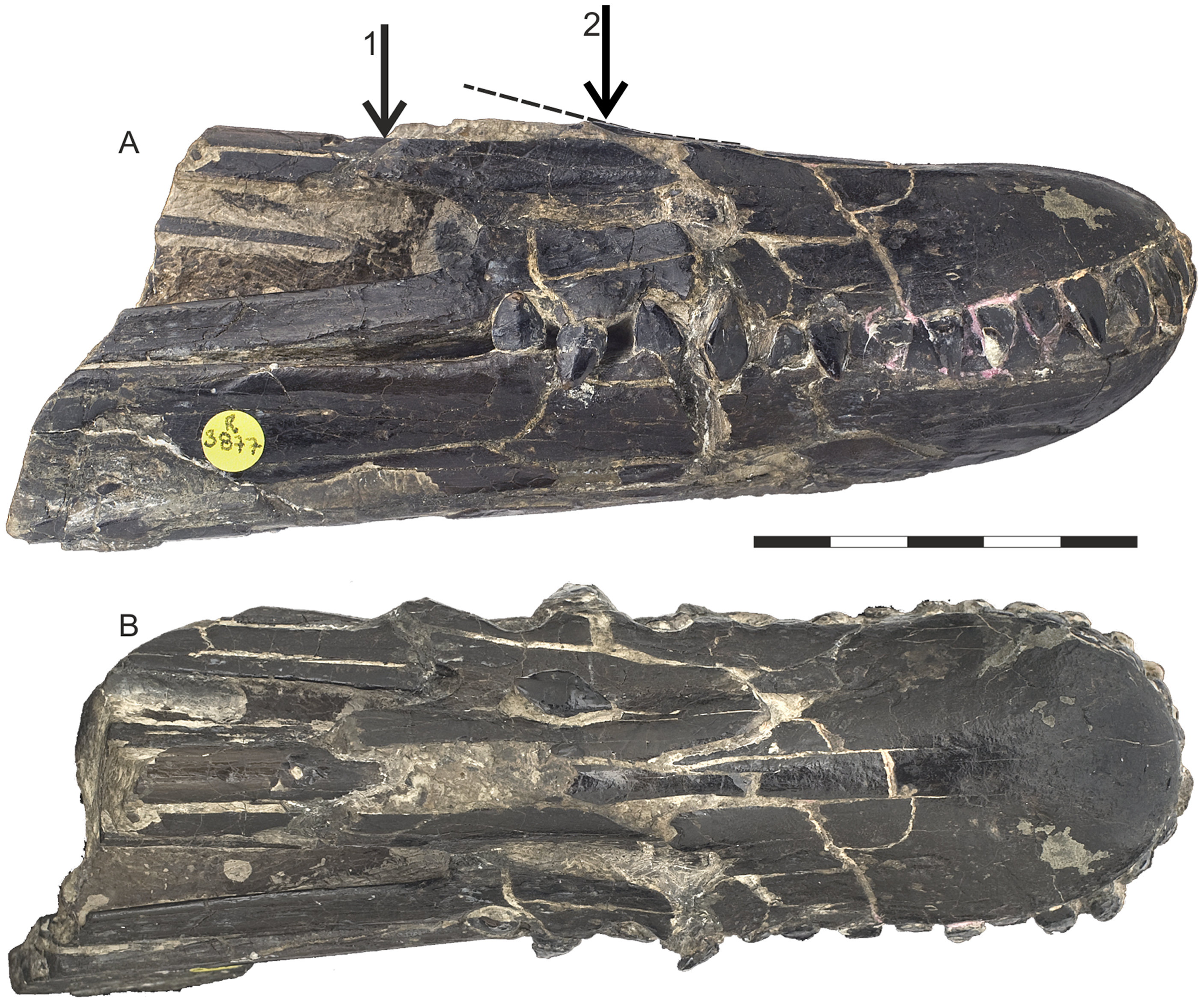
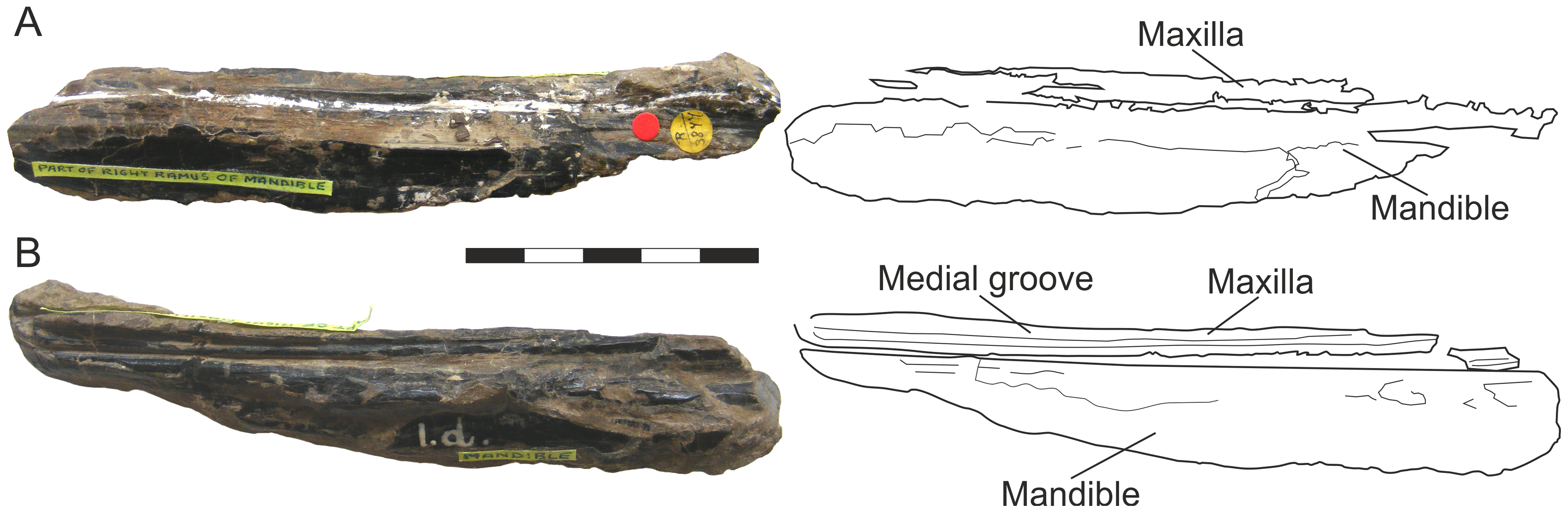
Snout of NHMUK R3877 highlighting crushing and displacement of bone (above), and the missing jaw fragment rediscovered by Witton (below)

In 2012, the British palaeontologist Mark P. Witton reported the "rediscovery" of a jaw-piece that belonged to specimen NHMUK R3877, found while he was visiting the museum to photograph the skull. The piece had been neglected in a drawer for a century, perhaps removed shortly after Hooley's 1913 article, and had apparently not been fully prepared until decades later. Though Hooley included an illustration of the piece, it was not incorporated into his reconstruction of the skull, and the skull length he proposed had consequently been repeated by other researchers. Witton attempted to fit the skull together to see if the rediscovered piece would be a bridging element, and sought confirmation from other pterosaur researchers at the museum. He concluded that the jaw-piece represented almost the entire missing portion of the skull (which might only be missing millimetres), and suggested that the skull would have been much shorter than previously assumed, making I. latidens very distinct from other istiodactylids.

Witton's updated skull reconstruction was different enough from the skull of I. sinensis for him to conclude they did not belong in the same genus, but he advised against placing I. sinensis in its own genus. Witton pointed out that the two Istiodactylus species had been grouped with Liaoxipterus brachyognathus in previous studies, and that I. sinensis may instead have been a species in the genus Liaoxipterus, or even the same species, since they were found in the same formation and had few differences. He provisionally retained the existing taxonomy, awaiting further investigation of the issue. Witton stated that Istiodactylus specimen NHMUK R3877 remains the most well-preserved istiodactylid skeleton, and that some details of the group's anatomy are known only from it. In 2022, the Chinese palaeontologist Yizhi Xu and colleagues stated that the difference between Liaoxipterus and both species of Istiodactylus was limited, and that their interrelationship warranted further study.

Howse and colleagues suggested in 2001 that the now missing holotype jaws of I. latidens may be specimen CAMMZ T706, which was recognised in 1982 by the English palaeontologist Jenny A. Clack, but had no documented history prior to the mid-1960s. In 2021, the Russian palaeontologist Alexander O. Averianov and colleagues suggested that the front ends of an istiodactylid snout and mandible at the Vernadsky State Geological Museum in Moscow, specimen SGM 1810–01, could also be the missing holotype, since analysis of pollen from its matrix showed that it likely came from the Vectis Formation, where I. latidens has been found. It may have entered the Russian collection when a curator of this museum, the Russian geologist Alexey Pavlov and his wife the Ukrainian paleontologist Maria V. Pavlova, visited England in 1888 for the Geological Congress, and again in 1891, possibly acquiring the specimen then. Averianov and colleagues performed CT scans on the specimen, revealing its anatomical details.

== Description ==
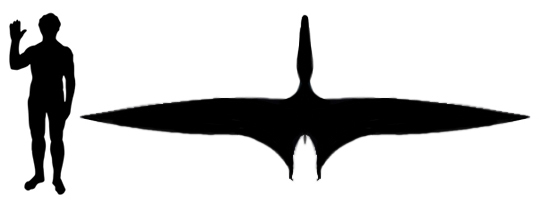
Approximate size of I. latidens compared to a human

Istiodactylus was quite a large pterosaur, with estimates of its wingspan ranging from 4.3 to 5 metres (14 to 16 ft). This makes it the largest known member of its family, Istiodactylidae. Some isolated pterosaur wing-bone fragments that may belong to this genus indicate a wingspan as large as 8 metres (26 ft). The most completely known skull is fragmentary but is thought to have been about 45 centimetres (18 in) in length, based on a long-lost fragment of its jaw reported in 2012. Before this, the skull had been estimated to be 56 centimetres (22 in) long. At 28.5 centimetres (11.2 in), the jaws were less than 80 percent of the skull's length, which is short for a pterodactyloid pterosaur. As a pterosaur, Istiodactylus would have been covered in hair-like pycnofibres, and had extensive wing-membranes, which were distended by a long wing-finger.

The skull of Istiodactylus was relatively short and broad compared to most other pterosaurs, and it had a short, low snout-region in front of the nostrils. Much of the skull was occupied by very large naso-antorbital fenestrae (openings which combine the antorbital fenestra and the bony nostril). Unusually, this opening extended past the jaw joint and the back of the mandible. The orbit (eye socket) was reclined and slender, and was capped at the front by a tuberosity. The hind part of the skull was relatively tall, and the skull table bore a low crest or ridge at the front. The snout identified in 2021 revealed that Istiodactylus had a palatal ridge as in other pterosaurs, a feature previously unknown in this genus. The mandibular symphysis (where the two halves of the lower jaw connected) was abbreviated, and the mandible was deepest where the mandibular rami (halves of the lower jaw) diverged. The maxilla of the upper jaw was very slender, and only 6–7 millimetres (0.2–0.3 in) deep. The tip of the beak was rounded, blunt, and heavily built.

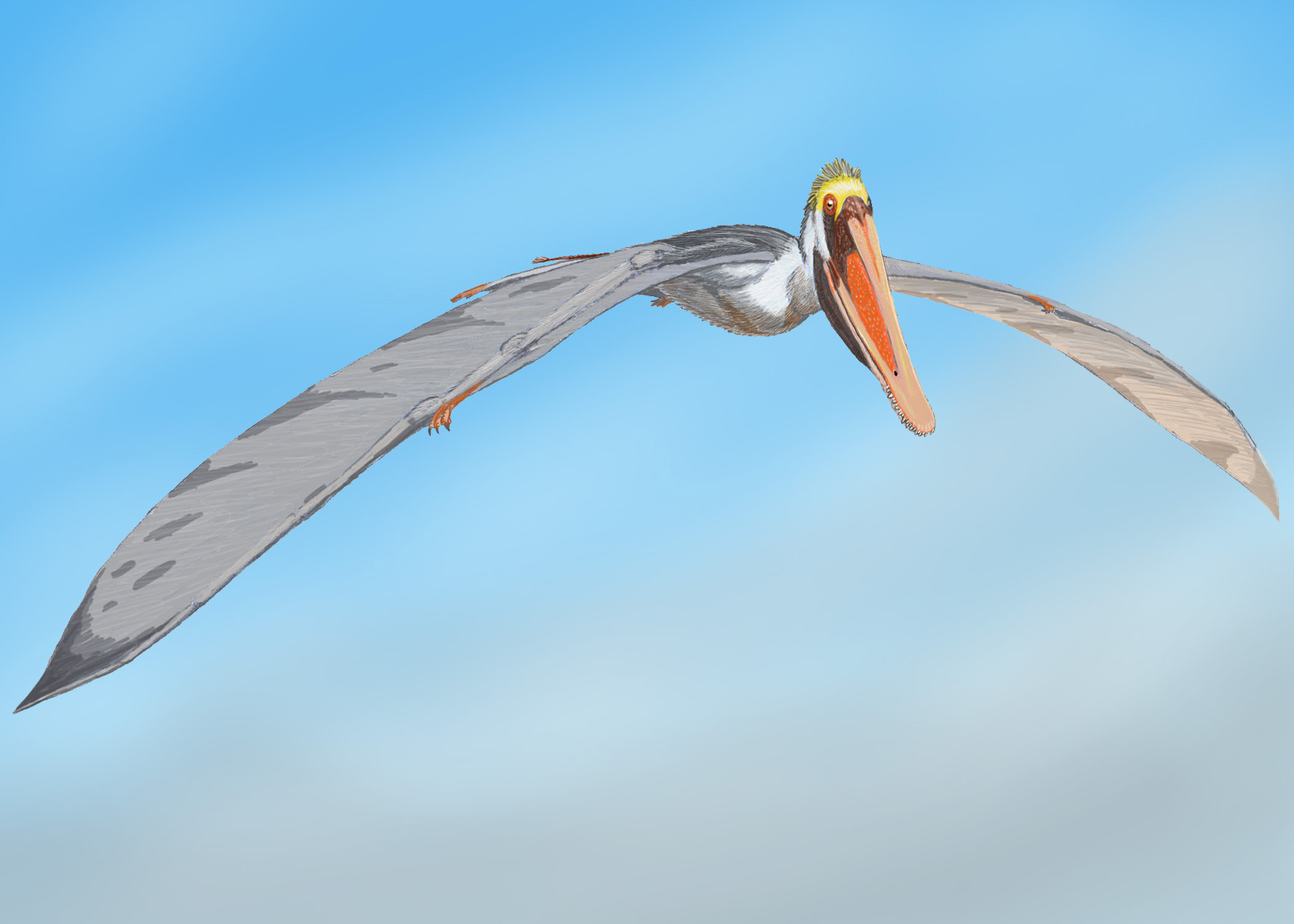
Restoration of a flying individual

The tips of the jaws bore a semicircle of 48 teeth which were even in size, triangular, and compressed sideways. The teeth have been described as "petal-like" or "lancet-like". The teeth had sharply pointed crowns and triangular roots that were shorter than the crowns. Most tooth crowns had slightly blunted points, or were somewhat worn. The margins of the tooth crowns were not serrated, but had faint keels. There were 24 upper teeth, restricted to the part in front of the nostril, and 24 lower teeth, restricted to the symphysal region. The upper and lower teeth interlocked, forming a "razor-edged" or "zig-zag" outline. The front teeth were closely spaced, and the hind teeth were more widely spaced, with recesses for the opposing teeth. No replacement teeth have been found in Istiodactylus specimens, unlike other pterosaurs, which is perhaps because they would disrupt the tightly interlocking dentition. A sharp projection between two teeth at the middle front of the mandible has been described as an odontoid (or "pseudo-tooth"), but was previously interpreted as an actual tooth. The odontoid may have been encased in a keratinous covering so that it could occlude with the teeth.

Apart from the skull, the skeleton of Istiodactylus was similar to those of other ornithocheiroid pterosaurs. The vertebral column, forelimb, and trunk bones were pneumatised by air sacs. The neural arches of the vertebrae had tall, sloping laminae. The notarium (a structure consisting of fused vertebrae in the shoulder-region of some pterosaurs and birds) consisted of six fused trunk vertebrae, with their neural spines fused into a plate, on which the shoulder blades articulated with a depression on each side. The main part of the sternum was very deep, with a bowed front edge and a shallow, triangular keel. The facets of the sternum that contacted with the coracoids were saddle-shaped and arranged asymmetrically. The humerus (upper arm bone) was stout and had a sharply curved deltopectoral crest. The forelimbs of istiodactylids were large, up to 4.5 times longer than their legs. The long wing-finger may have occupied 50 percent of the wing-skeleton. The hindlimbs were short compared to the forelimbs, and the feet were as long as the small third finger.

== Classification ==
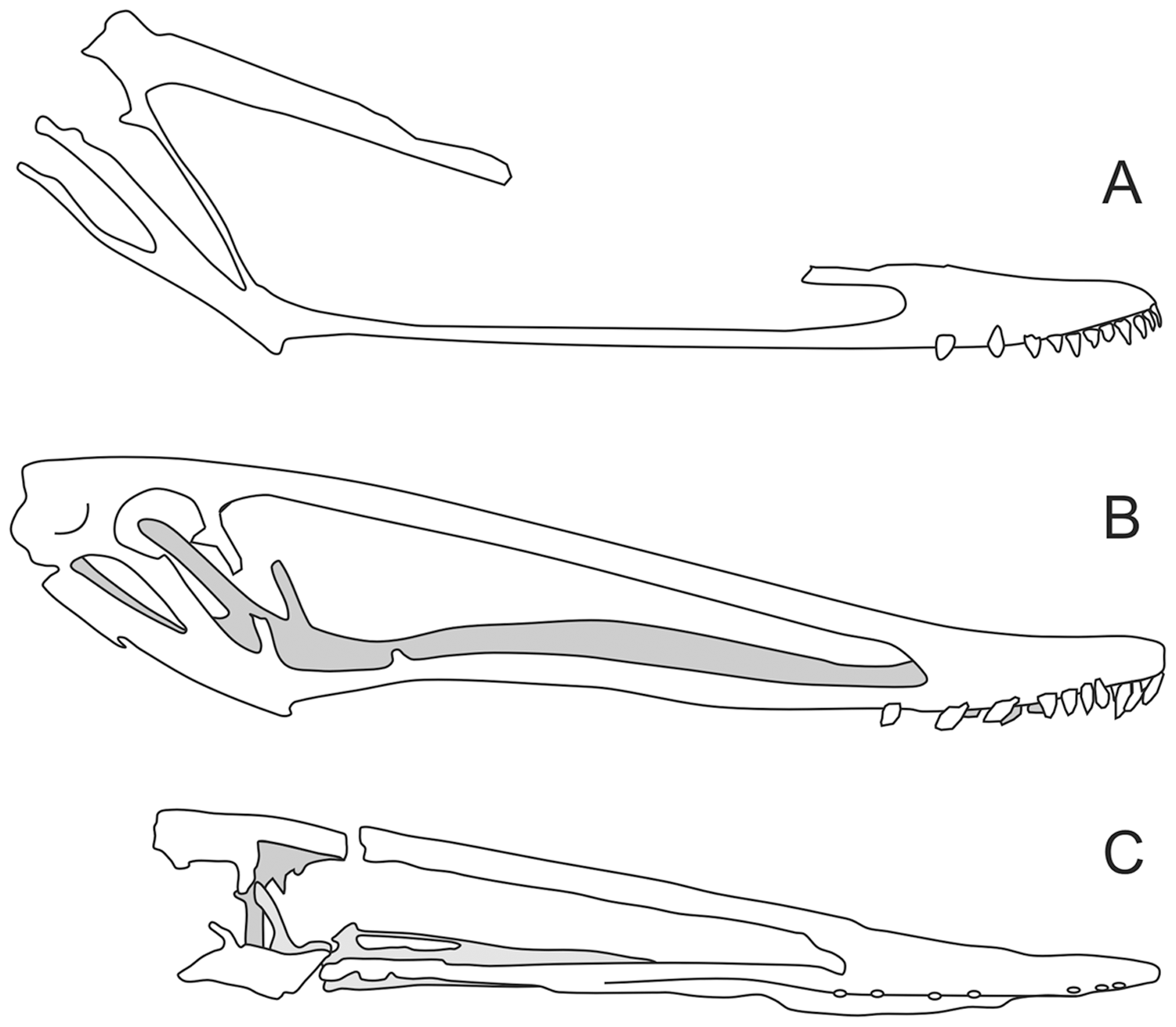
Istiodactylid skulls: I. latidens (A), I. sinensis (B) and Nurhachius (C)

In 1913, Hooley found the skull and teeth of "O." latidens most similar to those of the pterosaurs Scaphognathus and Dimorphodon, and even considered it a modified form of the former. Later writers classified it among the short-tailed pterodactyloids, and from the 1980s and onwards, it was generally found to be closest to Ornithocheirus and Pteranodon, based on computerised phylogenetic analyses. In 2003, two competing schools of pterosaur classification emerged, that of David Unwin and that of Alexander W. Kellner; both found Istiodactylus to be a member of the group Ornithocheiroidea, but the exact configuration and content of this group has varied between studies. Within Ornithocheiroidea, Unwin found Istiodactylidae (which at the time only consisted of Istiodactylus) to group with the toothless Pteranodontidae, whereas Kellner found the family to group with the toothed Anhangueridae. In 2014, Brian Andres and colleagues placed Istiodactylidae in the clade Lanceodontia, which consists of the toothed ornithocheiromorphs, to the exclusion of forms like Pteranodon.

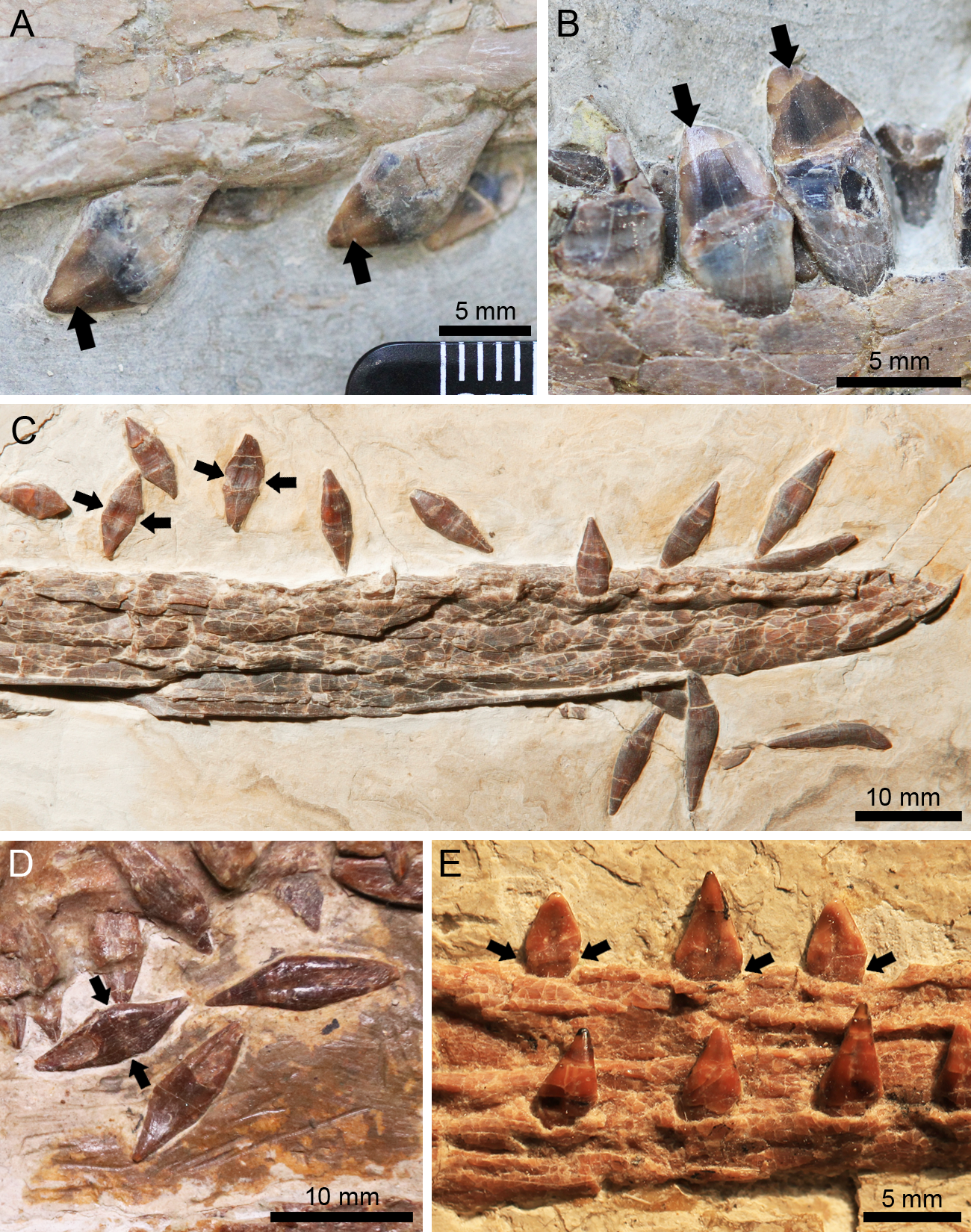
Teeth of I. sinensis (A-B) and other istiodactylids of the Jiufotang Formation

Since additional members of the family Istiodactylidae were discovered only in the 21st century, with many of those discoveries occurring in quick succession, the interrelationships and exact content of the group are still unclear and need reappraisal. In 2014, Andres and colleagues placed I. latidens, I. sinensis, and Liaoxipterus in a new subfamily within Istiodactylidae, which they called Istiodactylinae. In 2019, Xuanyu Zhou and colleagues found I. latidens and I. sinensis to be sister taxa, and close to Liaoxipterus. In the same year, Kellner and colleagues created the more inclusive group Istiodactyliformes for the family Istiodactylidae and its closest relatives, such as the new family Mimodactylidae, as shown in the cladogram below.

- Istiodactyliformes
  - Mimodactylidae
    - Haopterus gracilis
    - Mimodactylus libanensis
  - - Hongshanopterus lacustris
    - Istiodactylidae
      - Nurhachius ignaciobritoi
      - Istiodactylinae
        - Liaoxipterus brachyognathus
        - - Istiodactylus latidens
          - Istiodactylus sinensis

A 2023 analysis by Masanori Ozeki and colleagues also found I. latidens and I. sinensis to be sister taxa.

All istiodactylid remains are known from deposits in the Northern Hemisphere, dating from the Barremian–Aptian ages of the Early Cretaceous period. They are distinguished from other pterosaurs by features such as the shape and position of their teeth, broad snouts, narrowed orbits, and large naso-antorbital fenestrae. In addition to the istiodactylids from China, teeth indicate the presence of the group in Spain and the elsewhere in the UK. The Late Cretaceous genus Mimodactylus from Lebanon is the first istiodactyliform known from Gondwana (the southern supercontinent), with members of the group previously only known from Early Cretaceous sites in Europe and Asia.

Two fossils from North America formerly thought to have been similar to istiodactylids are now believed to have been misidentified; a mandible fragment from the Morrison Formation probably belongs to another pterosaur group, and Gwawinapterus is most likely a fish. Archaeoistiodactylus from the Middle Jurassic of China was named in reference to the describers assuming it was ancestral to Istiodactylus, but it was later shown to be the poorly preserved remains of an unrelated wukongopterid.

== Palaeobiology ==
=== Feeding and diet ===
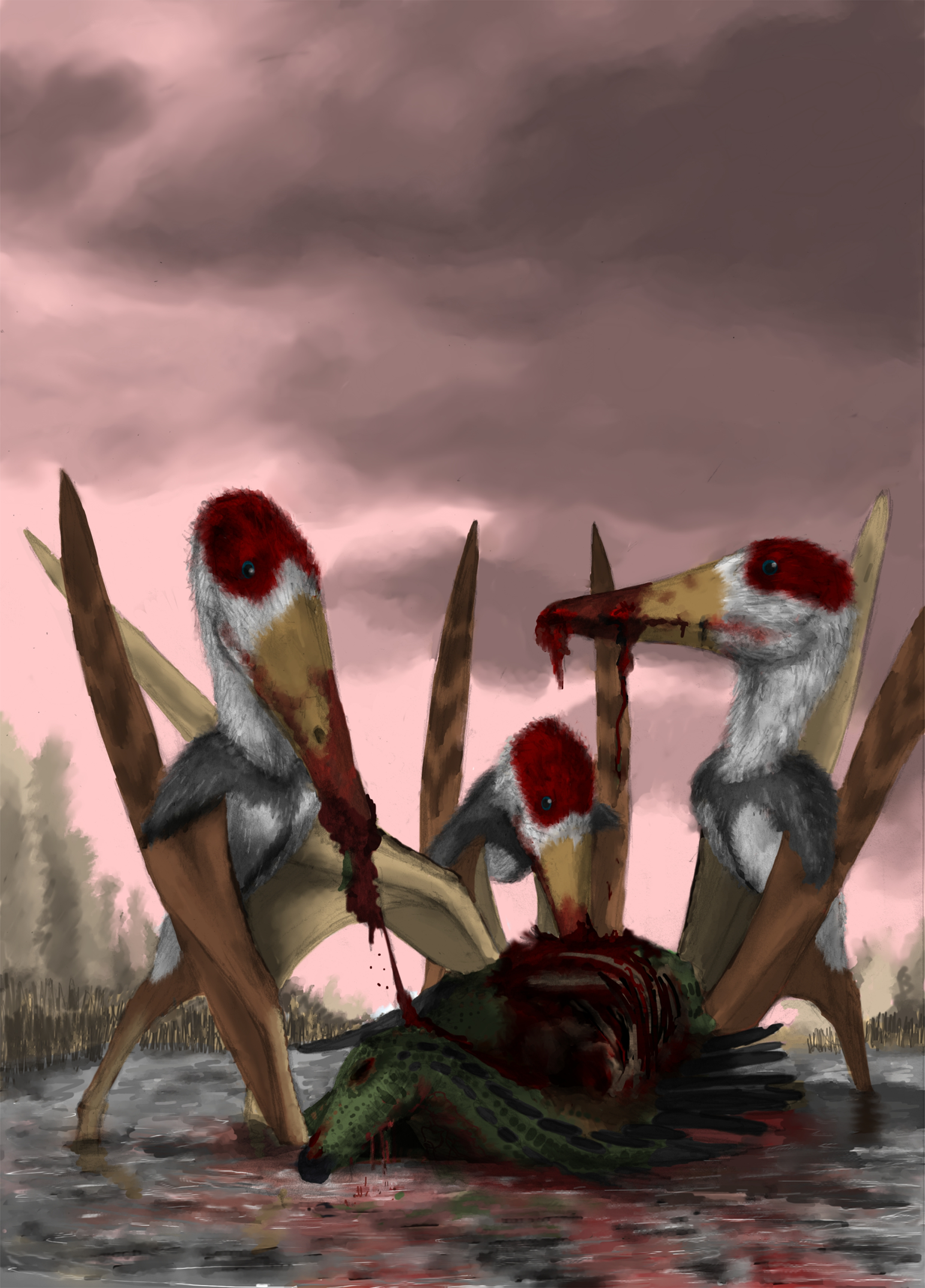
Restoration of a group feeding on a stegosaur carcass in a shallow riverbed, by Witton, 2012

Based on his 1913 long-jawed reconstruction, Hooley found the beak of Istiodactylus similar to those of birds such as herons, storks, and skimmers, and suggested that Istiodactylus fed on fish, occasionally dipping in water in pursuit of prey. In 1991, the German palaeontologist Peter Wellnhofer compared the front ends of the jaws of Istiodactylus with those of a duck, while noting it was not a "duck-billed pterosaur" (as it has been popularly called), due to its strong teeth. He suggested that the alternately meshing teeth and the broad snout indicated a fish-eating animal. Howse and colleagues found that the distinctive teeth indicated a specialised diet or feeding technique, and instead suggested they could have been used to remove chunks of meat from prey or a carcass in the manner of a "cookie cutter" or by biting and twisting the skull. They also pointed out that the animal was known from continental beds, and may therefore have been a scavenger similar to vultures or marabou storks. In 2010, Attila Ősi agreed that Istiodactylus was able to cut meat in this way, but added that it would not have been able to process food with precisely occluding teeth.

In 2012, Witton pointed out that the teeth of Istiodactylus were unlike the enlarged and recurved teeth in pterosaurs such as rhamphorhynchines and ornithocheirids, which were ideal for obtaining slippery prey. Instead, the "razor-edged" teeth would be better suited for shearing food than for grabbing fish. Witton also discussed an unpublished Ph.D. thesis by the German palaeontologist Michael Fastnacht, wherein biomechanical calculations predicted that Istiodactylus filter-fed in a manner similar to ducks. Witton found that Fastnacht had reconstructed the skull incorrectly, for example by making the rostrum too broad and the jaws too long, resulting in a misleading similarity to the skull of a duck. Pointing out that the jaws were dissimilar to the broad, flattened, and spatulate bills of ducks, and that the teeth were not suited for filter-feeding, he dismissed the idea of a duck-like lifestyle for Istiodactylus.

In 2012 and 2013, Witton further elaborated on the idea that Istiodactylus was a scavenger; scavenging birds have a mosaic of strong and weak elements in their skulls; they do not have to struggle with their prey, but need to be able to tear and pull morsels from cadavers. These birds also have relatively small eyes compared to predatory birds, as they do not need to search for prey animals that eluded them, or to make carefully judged attacks on their prey. Istiodactylus appears to have had large jaw muscles, and therefore a strong bite, and the skull was deep, which would have helped resist bending when pulling flesh. Individual bones of the skull were instead slender and shallow, and the toothrows were short, which indicates Istiodactylus did not have the necessary reinforcements for active predation, not needing to subdue struggling prey. Together, these features indicate Istiodactylus fed on large prey that necessitated strong jaws for processing, yet were also comparatively motionless, such that strain on the jaws and skull could be controlled during feeding. The eyes of Istiodactylus also seem to have been proportionally small, compared to pterosaurs that are presumed to have been predatory (such as ornithocheirids). Witton concluded that among pterosaurs, Istiodactylus appears to have been the best-adapted for a scavenging lifestyle. He envisioned that istiodactylids would have to step back from a carcass if more powerful carnivores were attracted to it, but would return to finish the remains when those animals were satiated.

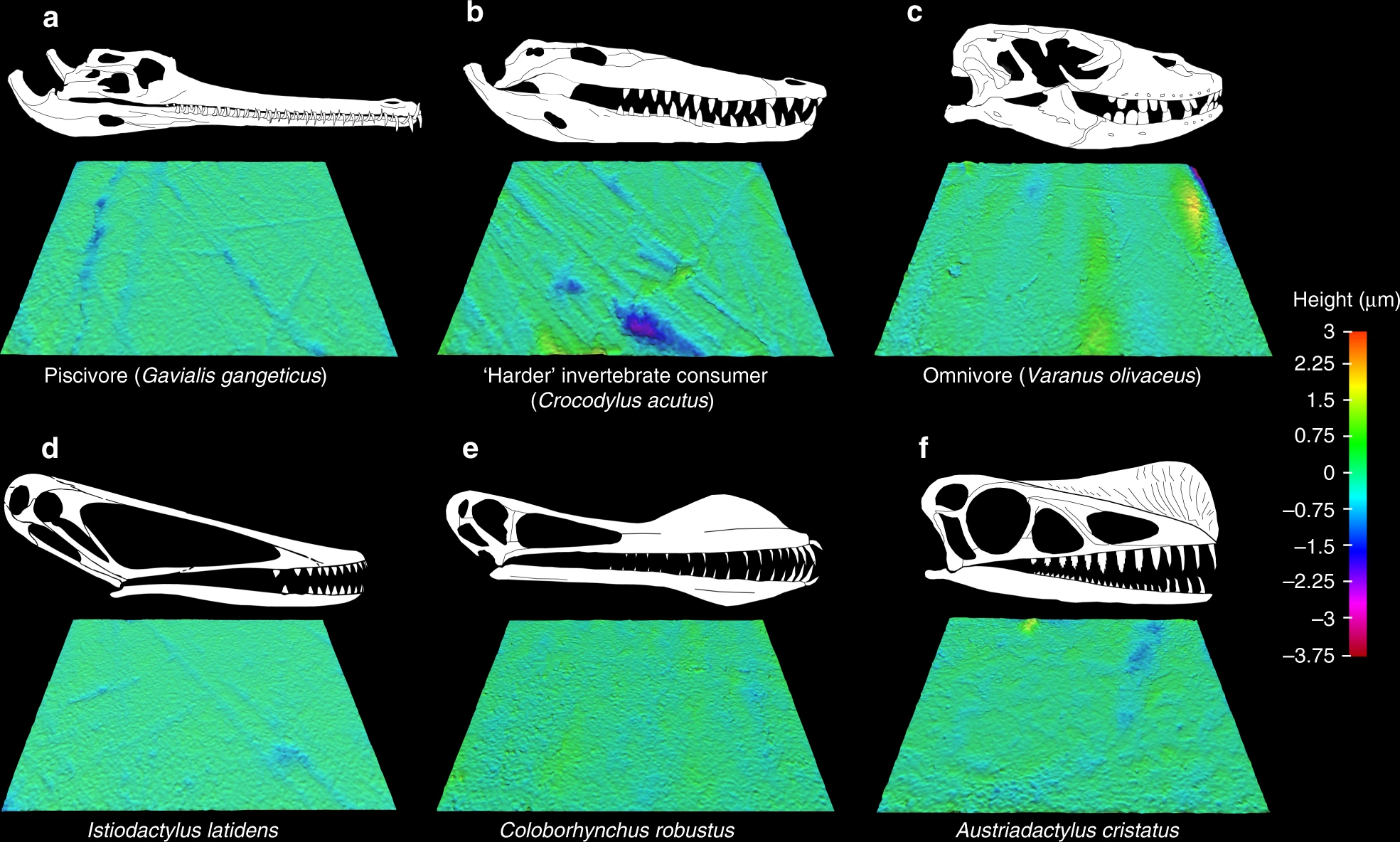
Dietary guilds of modern reptiles based on dental microwear texture (above), and pterosaur dental microwear (d is Istiodactylus)

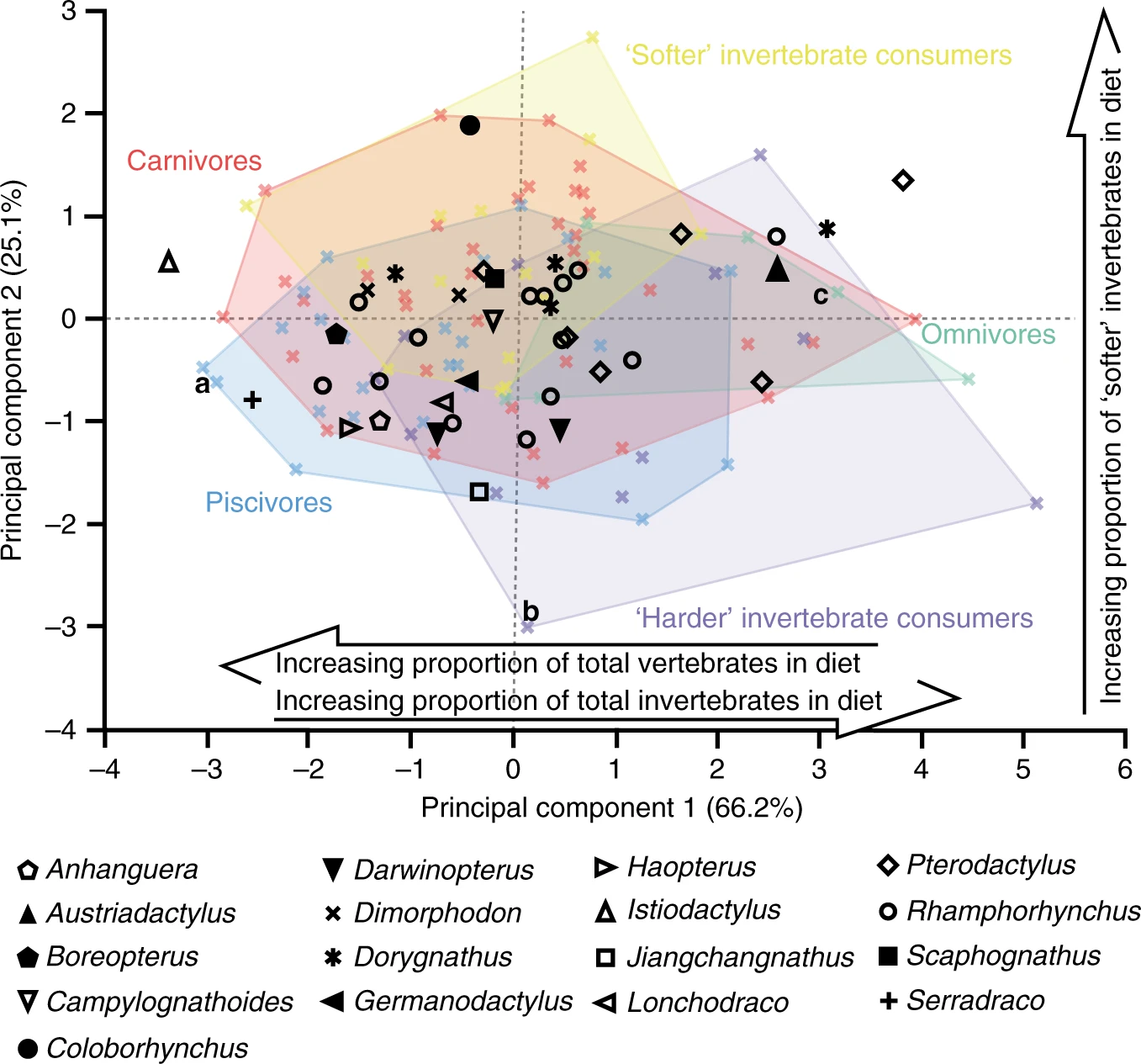
Texture-dietary space for modern reptiles and pterosaurs (△ is Istiodactylus)

In 2014, Martill suggested that the odontoid at the tip of the lower jaw of Istiodactylus served to fill the space where no tooth was present. This completed an arc-like bite that would have been necessary to sever morsels that would otherwise remain attached by a thread. Martill stated that few other animals are known with teeth similar to those of Istiodactylus, but pointed out the similarity to various types of sharks and reptiles, including the cookiecutter shark, which takes circular bites from prey much larger than itself, such as pelagic fish as well as whales. Istiodactylus may also have taken circular bites from prey larger than itself (such as dinosaurs and crocodiles), but perhaps also from fish, for example by snapping at their backs near the water surface.

Martill stated that there were many differences between the skull of Istiodactylus and extant scavengers, such as the lack of a sharp, pointed beak, which could have made it less capable of tearing flesh, but the long neck may have provided enough pulling power, and the claws on the fingers may have been used to manipulate carcasses. Martill agreed that Istiodactylus was most likely a scavenger that would have used its robust teeth to scrape meat from bones, as indicated by wear-facets on the tooth-tips (he proposed that scratch-marks should be looked for on dinosaur bones). He also suggested that if they were scraping away the last flesh from a carcass, like marabou storks, they would have been "in the back of the queue" for access to it.

In 2020, Jordan Bestwick and colleagues found that Istiodactylus was an obligate consumer of vertebrate animals, since it plotted closest to carnivorous reptiles in an analysis of dental microwear texture.

=== Locomotion ===
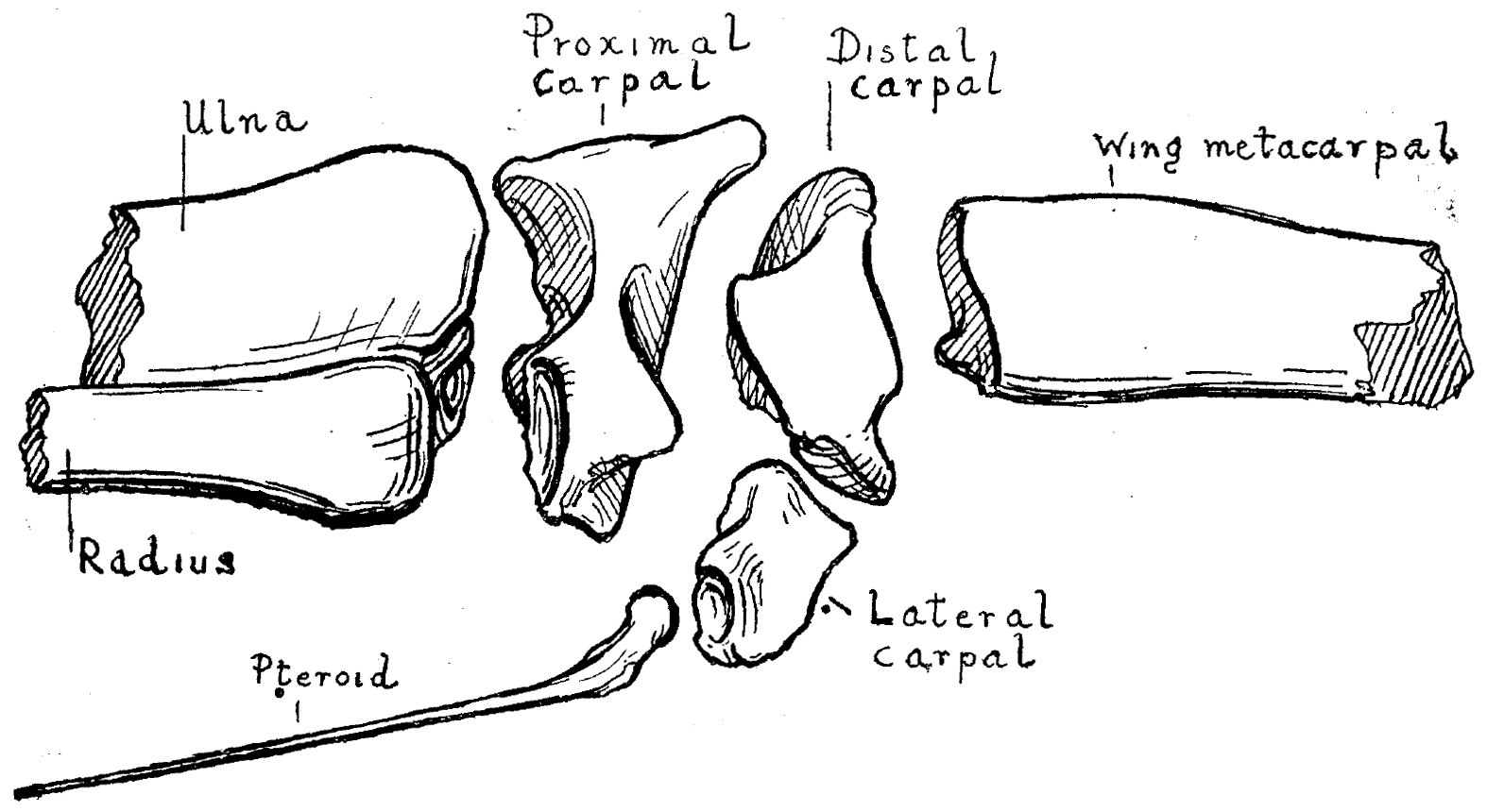
Disarticulated wrist bones, as shown by Hankin and Watson, 1914

Wing elements of Istiodactylus were used to model pterosaur wing-mechanics by Ernest H. Hankin and David M. S. Watson in 1914, and by Cherrie D. Bramwell and George R. Whitfield in 1974, but the details of istiodactylid flight performance have not been studied. Witton suggested that istiodactylids would have been powerful fliers, due to an enlarged area for downstroke musculature attachments and well-developed pectoral and upper arm bones, and they probably spent much time in the air. Istiodactylids had wing-membranes connected to shortened bodies with short legs and long forelimbs, which may have created large wings with a high aspect ratio and low wing loadings. The wings of the istiodactylid Nurhachius have been compared to those of modern soaring birds (that fly with little flapping), and may have been ideal for low-energy soaring, which is necessary when searching for carrion. Flight is very important to birds that scavenge, as it helps them locate, reach, and eat carcasses before they are found by terrestrial carnivores. The wings of istiodactylids seem to have been shorter than those of other ornithocheiroids, which may have been more adapted to oceanic soaring; their wings may have been more suited for taking off and landing. Modern birds that soar inland have shorter and deeper wings than those that soar over the ocean; the wing shape of istiodactylids indicate that they may have preferred terrestrial settings.

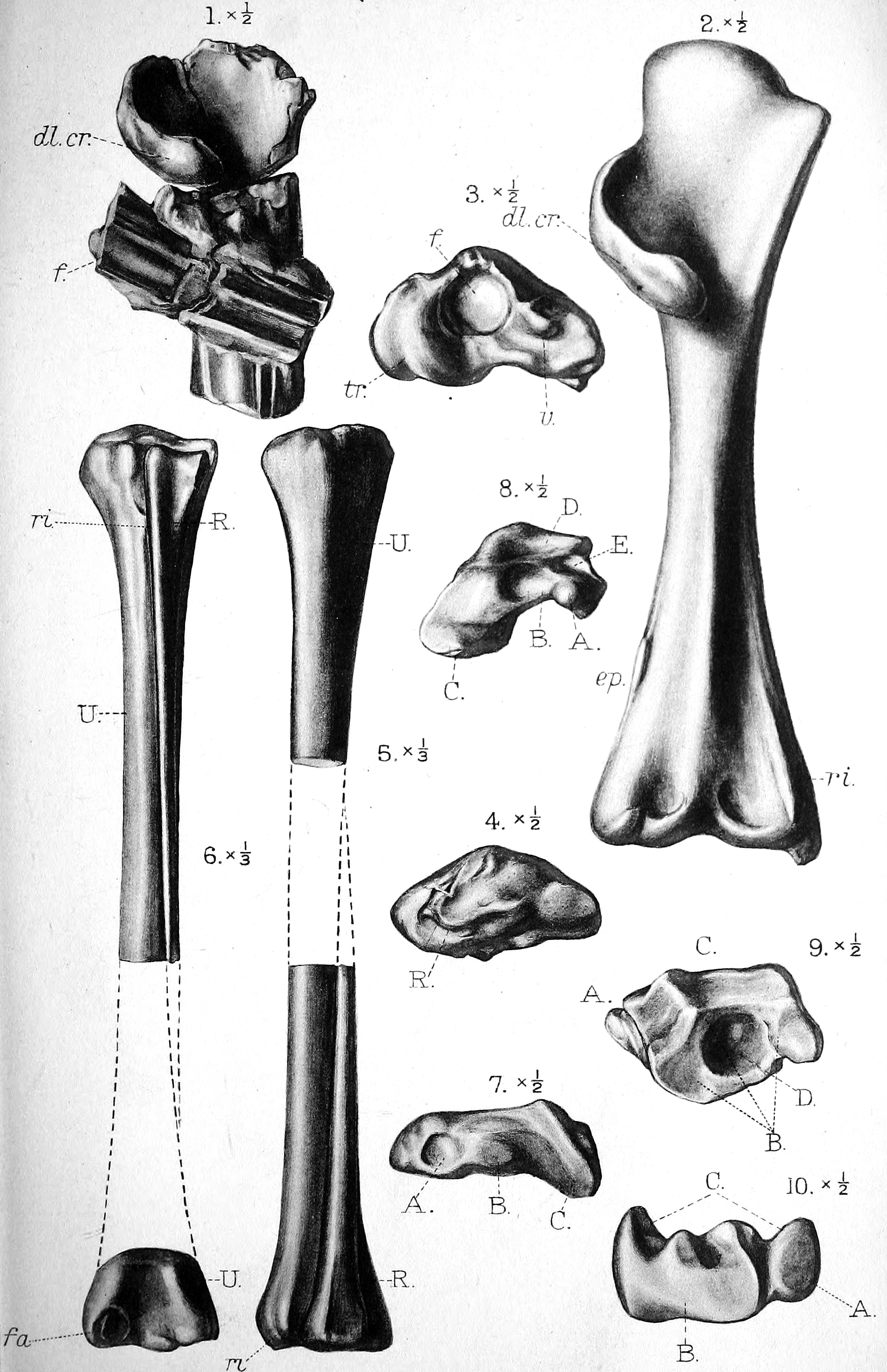
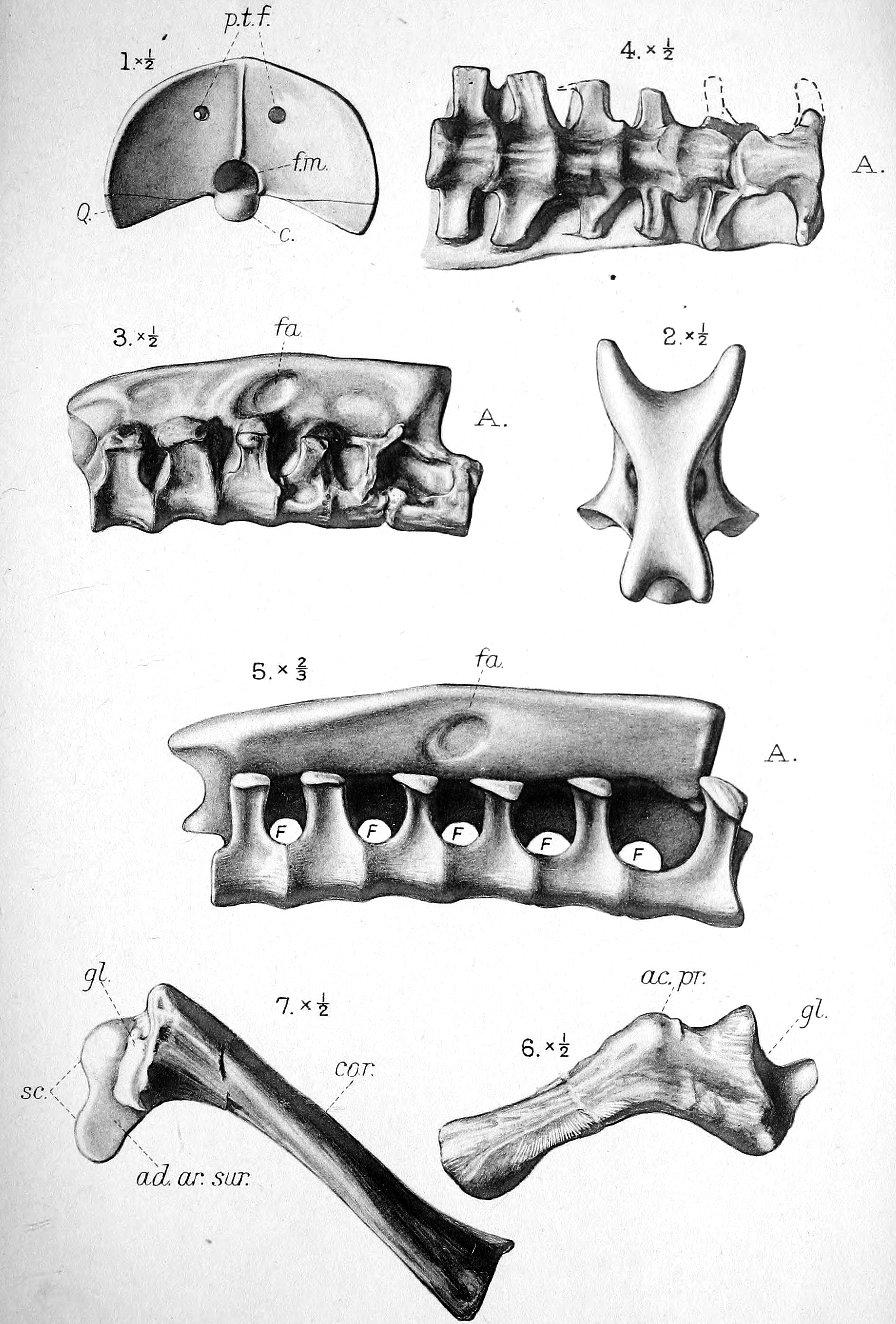
Illustrations of wing-bones such as parts of a humerus, ulna, radius, and carpals (left), as well as the occiput, notarium, a neck vertebra, and a shoulder blade (right), by Woodward, 1913

Witton also found that due to their relatively slighter flight-musculature, istiodactylids were adapted to launching from the ground like vultures, rather than from water like other ornithocheiroids. He also considered the fact that istiodactylid fossils are mainly found in sedimentary deposits that represent freshwater or brackish water, which received much terrestrial input, evidence that supports the idea of them scavenging in terrestrial settings. Witton found it unlikely that istiodactylids and their relatives were especially proficient on the ground, due to their disproportionate limbs and small appendages, though they may have had relatively large thigh muscles. He also found the feet too small in relation to their body size to have been used for climbing or suspension, as had previously been suggested.

== Palaeoenvironment ==
Istiodactylus is known from the Wessex Formation and the younger, overlying Vectis Formation of the Wealden Group on the Isle of Wight. These formations date from the Barremian to the lower Aptian ages of the Early Cretaceous, about 120 million years ago. It is uncertain from which of these formations the first known specimen was collected, but it may have been the Wessex Formation, where isolated Istiodactylus teeth have been found. The Wessex Formation consists of fluvial (associated with rivers) strata, and was deposited in a meander-belt river system which flowed from west to east and occupied the Wessex Basin. Hooley's specimens were from the Vectis Formation; these specimens are encrusted in pyrite, which is typical for fossils there. The Vectis Formation consists of coastal and near-shore deposits, which were deposited in an environment dominated by tides. During the Early Cretaceous, southern England would have had a mean temperature in the range of 20 to 25 °C (68 to 77 °F). The Wessex Formation would have had a semi-arid climate similar to the modern Mediterranean region.

The vegetation of the Wessex Formation was savannah- or chaparral-like, and included Caytoniales, cycads, ginkgos, conifers, and angiosperms. Other pterosaurs from the Wessex Formation include Caulkicephalus, "Ornithocheirus nobilis" (which is considered a dubious species), an undetermined ctenochasmatine, an azhdarchoid, and one or two other undetermined istiodactylids. This diversity is comparable to that seen in other parts of the world during the Early Cretaceous, and the lack of toothless pterosaurs may be due to preservation bias. Dinosaurs from the Wessex Formation include the theropods Ornithodesmus, Neovenator, Aristosuchus, Thecocoelurus, and Calamospondylus; the ornithopods Iguanodon, Hypsilophodon, and Valdosaurus; the sauropods Pelorosaurus and Chondrosteosaurus; and the ankylosaur Polacanthus. Other animals include gastropods, bivalves, bony fishes, chondrichthyes, lissamphibians, lizards, turtles, crocodilians, birds, and mammals.

== See also ==
- List of pterosaur genera
- Timeline of pterosaur research

== Bibliography ==
- Witton, M. P. (2013). Pterosaurs: Natural History, Evolution, Anatomy (1st ed.). Princeton and Oxford: Princeton University Press. ISBN 978-0-691-15061-1.
