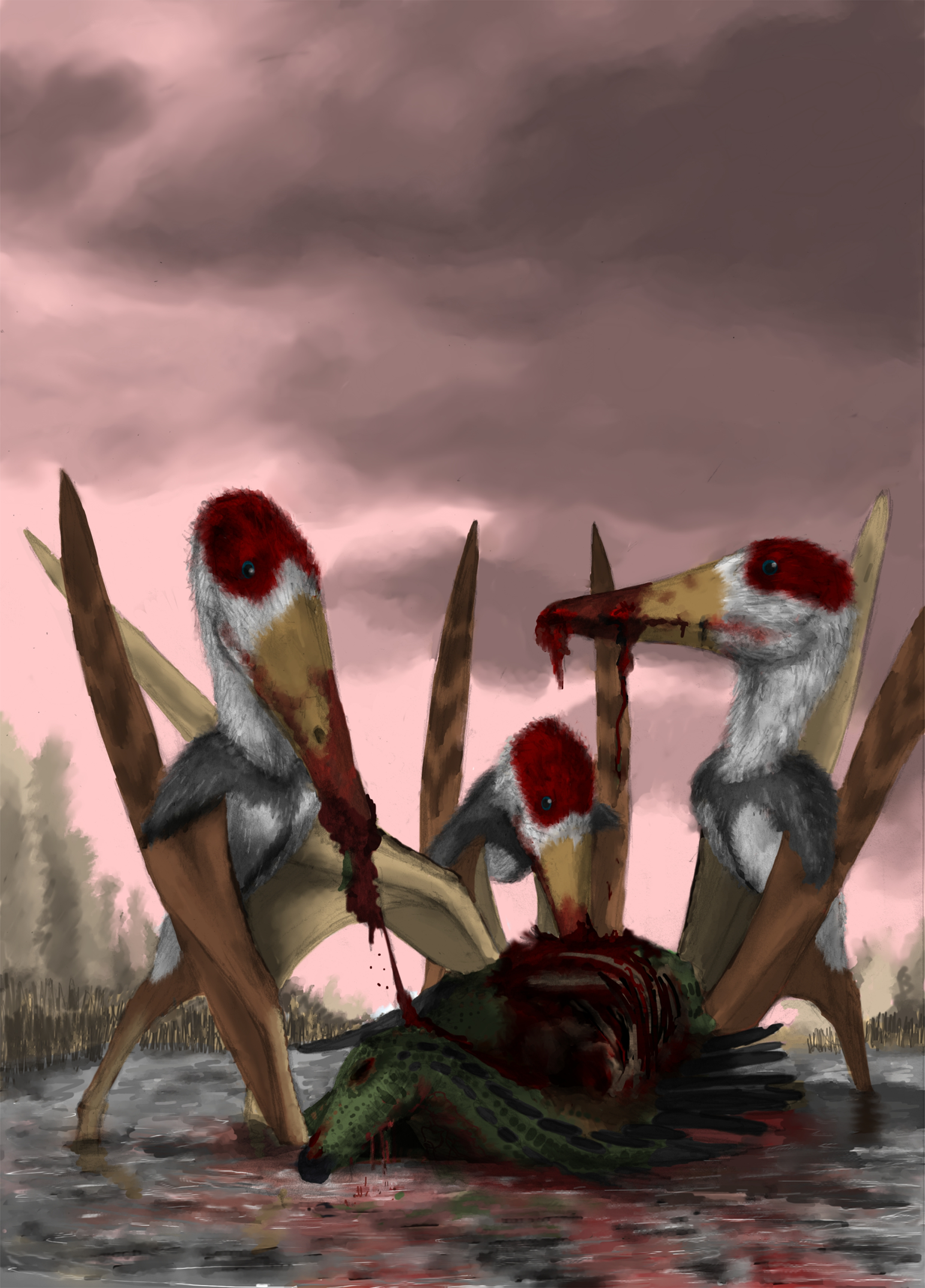
- Life restoration of Istiodactylus latidens feeding on a stegosaur corpse.

Scientific classification
- Kingdom: Animalia
- Phylum: Chordata
- Class: Reptilia
- Order: †Pterosauria
- Suborder: †Pterodactyloidea
- Clade: †Lanceodontia
- Clade: †Istiodactyliformes
- Family: †Istiodactylidae; Howse, Milner & Martill, 2001

Type species
- †Ornithodesmus latidens Seeley, 1901

Genera
- †Lingyuanopterus; †Longchengpterus; †Luchibang; †Nurhachius; †Istiodactylinae; †Istiodactylus; †Liaoxipterus

= Istiodactylidae =

Istiodactylids Temporal range: Early Cretaceous, 130–120 Ma Possible Middle Jurassic record

Family of istiodactyliform pterosaurs

Istiodactylidae is a small family of pterosaurs. This family was named in 2001 after the type genus Istiodactylus was discovered not to be a member of the genus Ornithodesmus.

== Systematics and distribution ==
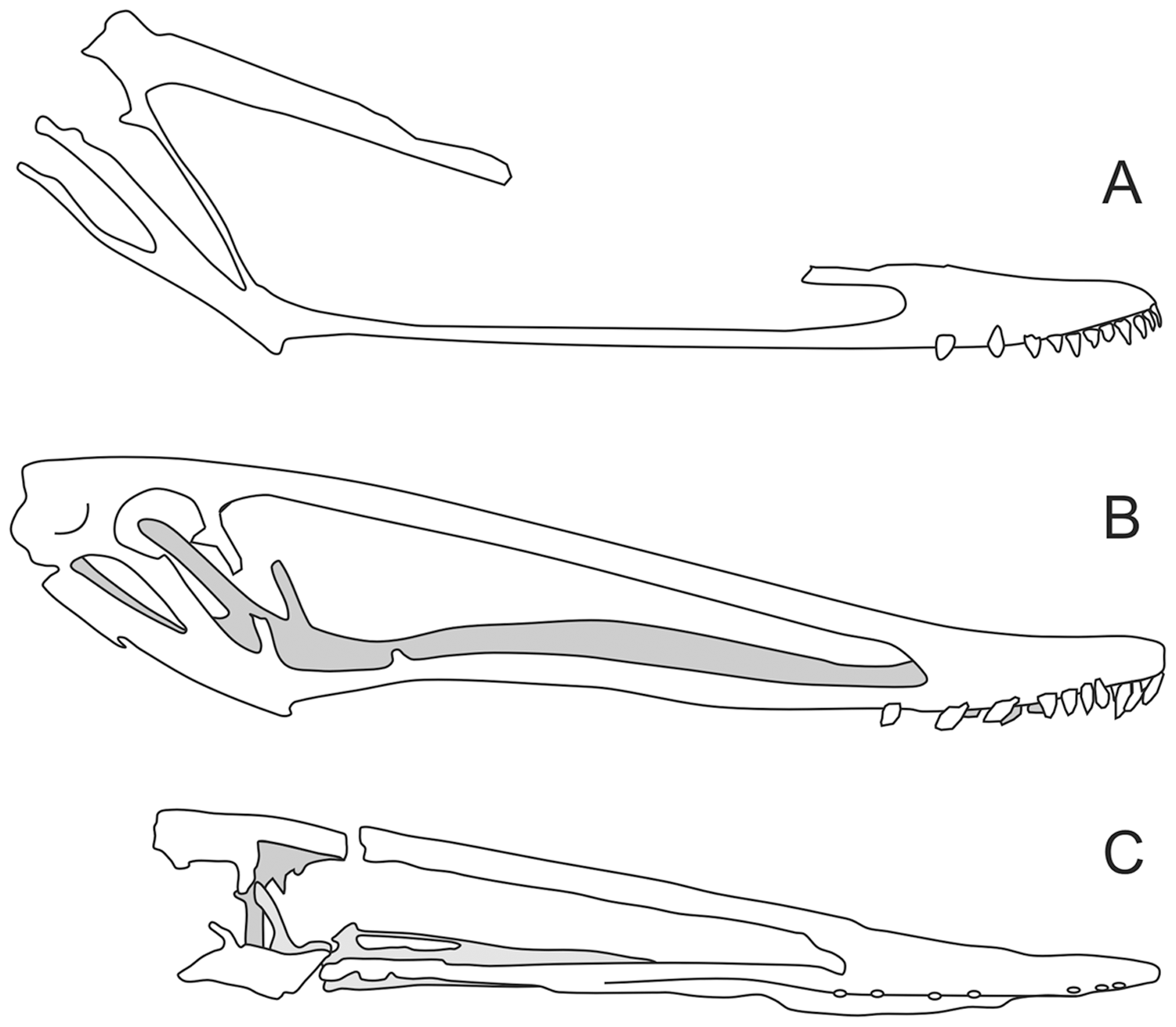
Istiodactylid skulls: A) Istiodactylus latidens (NHMUK R3877) (B) Istiodactylus sinensis (NGMC 99-07-11) and (C) Nurhachius ignaciobritoi (IVPP V-13288)

Remains of taxa that can be confidently assigned to Istiodactylidae have been found in the UK and China, in rocks dating from the Early Cretaceous period (Barremian to Aptian stage). Arbour and Currie (2011) described Canadian Gwawinapterus beardi as a member of Istiodactylidae living in the late Cretaceous (upper Campanian stage); however, Witton (2012) suggested the tooth replacement pattern in this animal does not match that of pterosaurs, suggesting that the species might be non-pterosaurian. Additional research suggested that the species was in fact a fish. The earliest known species might be Archaeoistiodactylus linglongtaensis, from the Middle Jurassic of China; however, it also has been suggested that the holotype specimen of this species might actually be a poorly preserved specimen of Darwinopterus. Hongshanopterus, a supposed istiodactylid from China, has been reclassified as a non-istiodactylid member of Ornithocheiroidea of uncertain phylogenetic placement by Witton (2012).

Istiodactylids were medium-sized pterosaurs with flat, rounded jaws similar to that of a duck. They had small teeth lining their jaws, however, and this can mostly be seen in the more advanced genera such as Istiodactylus.

== Classification ==
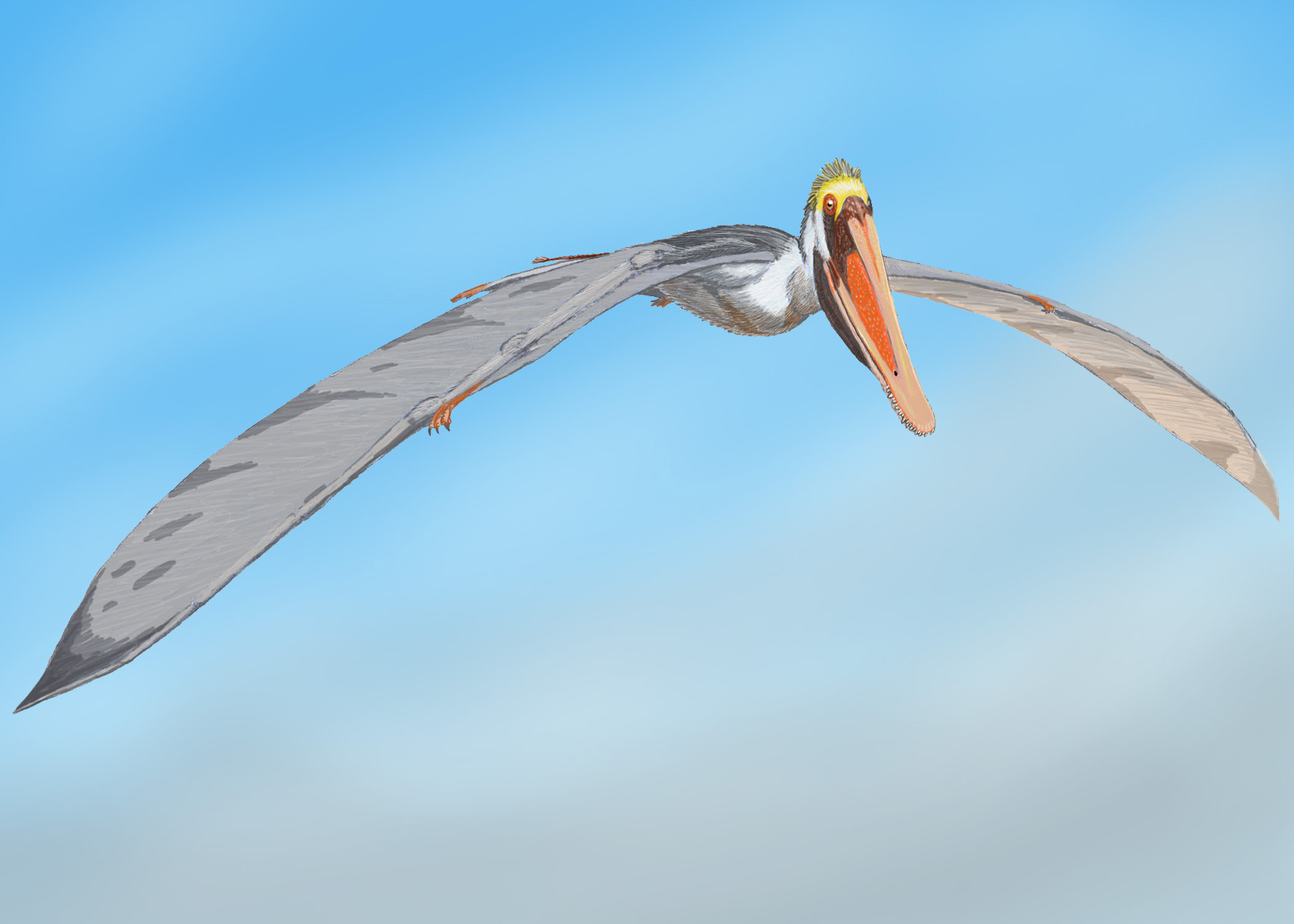
Restoration of an Istiodactylus in flight

Below is a cladogram showing the phylogenetic placement of this group within Pteranodontia from Andres and Myers (2013).

- Pteranodontia
  - Nyctosauridae
    - Muzquizopteryx coahuilensis
    - "Nyctosaurus" lamegoi
    - Nyctosaurus gracilis
  - - Alamodactylus byrdi
    - Pteranodontoidea
      - - Pteranodon longiceps
        - Pteranodon sternbergi
      - - Istiodactylidae
          - Longchengpterus zhaoi
          - - Nurhachius ignaciobritoi
            - - Liaoxipterus brachyognathus
              - - Istiodactylus latidens
                - Istiodactylus sinensis
        - - Lonchodectes compressirostris
          - - Aetodactylus halli
            - - Cearadactylus atrox
              - - Brasileodactylus araripensis
                - - Ludodactylus sibbicki
                  - Ornithocheirae
                    - Anhangueridae
                      - Liaoningopterus gui
                      - - Anhanguera araripensis
                        - - Anhanguera blittersdorffi
                          - - Anhanguera piscator
                            - Anhanguera santanae
                    - Ornithocheiridae
                      - Tropeognathus mesembrinus
                      - - Ornithocheirus simus
                        - - Coloborhynchus clavirostris
                          - Coloborhynchus wadleighi

The cladogram below is a topology recovered by Kellner et al. (2019). In the analyses, they recovered Istiodactylidae within the more inclusive group Istiodactyliformes, and assigned both Istiodactylus and Liaoxipterus to a new subfamily called Istiodactylinae, but kept Nurhachius as a basal member.

- Istiodactyliformes
  - Mimodactylidae
    - Haopterus
    - Mimodactylus
  - - Hongshanopterus
    - Istiodactylidae
      - Nurhachius
      - Istiodactylinae
        - Istiodactylus
        - Liaoxipterus

== Paleobiology ==
=== Lifestyle ===
Unlike most ornithocheiroids, istiodactylids bear morphologies suited to a terrestrial life and many of their fossils have been found in freshwater-deposits. Istiodactylids are considered to be pterosaurian equivalents to vultures: acting as the clean-up crew in their habitats. The swimming abilities of Istiodactylids have not been analyzed, in contrast to Ornithocheirids.
