= Longchengpterus =

Longchengpterus Temporal range: Early Cretaceous, 120 Ma

Scientific classification
- Kingdom: Animalia
- Phylum: Chordata
- Class: Reptilia
- Order: †Pterosauria
- Suborder: †Pterodactyloidea
- Genus: †Longchengpterus; Wang et al., 2006
- Species: †L. zhaoi

Binomial name
- †Longchengpterus zhaoi Wang et al., 2006

Synonyms
- Nurhachius ignaciobritoi

Genus of istiodactylid pterosaur from the Early Cretaceous

Longchengpterus, sometimes misspelled as "Lonchengopterus", is a genus of istiodactylid pterodactyloid pterosaur from the Barremian-Aptian-age Lower Cretaceous Jiufotang Formation of Chaoyang, Liaoning, China. Its fossil remains dated back about 120 million years ago.

== Etymology ==
The genus was named in 2006 by Wang Li, Li Li, Duan Ye and Cheng Shao-li. The genus name is derived from the old name of Chaoyang City, Longcheng, and a Latinized Greek pteron, "wing". The specific name honors Zhao Dayu, the president of Shenyang Normal University and a contributor to the founding of the Western Liaoning Institute of Mesozoic Paleontology.

== Description ==
Longchengpterus is based on holotype LPM 00023, found at Yuanjiawa near Dapingfanga, a compressed incomplete skeleton and partial skull on a single plate. The posterior part of the skull has been damaged. It is elongated with a length of 262 millimeters (10.3 in). The large skull opening, the fenestra nasantorbitalis, is triangular in form and occupies much of the snout. The teeth in the upper jaw are concentrated in the front part and spaced far apart; their number is uncertain. The lower jaws have been well preserved. They are 220 millimeters (8.7 in) long and their symphysis is short. Twelve teeth are present in the dentary. They have a sharp point but are laterally compressed, curving slightly inwards.

The humerus, 88 millimeters (3.5 in) long, has a low deltopectoral crest and no pneumatic foramen. The fourth metacarpal is longer than the first phalanx of the wing finger. The wingspan was about 2 meters (6.6 ft). The pelvis has been heavily damaged. Part of a femur is present, its estimated length was 91 millimeters (3.6 in).

== Classification ==
Longchengpterus has been assigned to the Istiodactylidae sharing with Istiodactylus tooth form and count as well as a large skull opening. A notable difference is the lack of a broad snout. It was the second istiodactylid named and the first from China, adding to the known pterosaur diversity from Early Cretaceous layers of China.

The cladogram below follows Witton's 2012 analysis, wherein he found Istiodactylidae to consist of five taxa (the first three species listed are outgroup or reference taxa):

- - Pterodactylus antiquus
  - - Pteranodon longiceps
    - Coloborhynchus spielbergi
    - Hongshanopterus lacustris
    - Haopterus gracilis
    - Istiodactylidae
      - Nurhachius ignaciobritoi
      - Longchengpterus zhaoi
      - - Istiodactylus latidens
        - Istiodactylus sinensis
        - Liaoxipterus brachyognathus

== See also ==
- List of pterosaur genera
- Timeline of pterosaur research
