= Linlongopterus =

Linlongopterus Temporal range: Albian, 120 Ma

Scientific classification
- Kingdom: Animalia
- Phylum: Chordata
- Class: Reptilia
- Order: †Pterosauria
- Suborder: †Pterodactyloidea
- Clade: †Lanceodontia
- Genus: †Linlongopterus; Rodrigues et al., 2015

Type species
- †Linlongopterus jennyae Rodrigues et al., 2015

Genus of pteranodontoid pterosaur from the Early Cretaceous

Linlongopterus is a genus of pteranodontoid pterodactyloid pterosaur from the Early Cretaceous of China. It is known from a partial skull and mandible first named and described in 2015 by Rodrigues et al.. The only known specimen was found in the Jiufotang Formation of the Liaoning Province or China, and lived around 120 million years ago. The full binomial of the taxon is Linlongopterus jennyae.

== Discovery and naming ==
The genus Linlongopterus was described and named in a 2015 paper by Taissa Rodrigues, Shunxing Jiang, Xin Cheng, Xiaolin Wang, and Alexander Kellner in Historical Biology, containing the single species L. jennyae. The species is based on a singular specimen, IVPP V15549, stored at the Institute of Vertebrate Paleontology and Paleoanthropology in Beijing, China. It was discovered in the rocks of the Jiufotang Formation in Jianchang County, Liaoning province, and is split into two blocks of material which needed to be glued back together for preparation. It consists of a partial skull and mandible; the various bones are disarticulated, and it is thought that this is the result of poor fusion in life, indicative the animal was not fully grown when it died. The generic name is derived from the Chinese "forest" (lin) and "dragon" (long), as well as the Latinised Greek "wing" (pteron), while the specific name honours the late Elfriede Kellner, nicknamed Jenny, a supporter of paleontology and mother of Alexander Kellner.

== Description ==
As a pteranodontoid pterosaur, Linlongopterus would have been a large flying reptile. It is primary distinguished from other members of the group due to the unique anatomy of the back of its skull. Most distinctive is orbit, or bony eye socket, which is lower on the skull than other pteranodontoids. Its bottom margin lined up with the bottom margin of the nasantorbital fenestra, a large hole compromising much of the skull in advanced pterosaurs. The strut of the jugal separating this fenestra from the orbit (the lacrimal process) is thin and strongly vertical in nature. Alongside these traits, the wide nature of the lower temporal fenestra, a hole at the back of the skull, distinguishes Linlongopterus from anhanguerids and istiodactylids, though is similar to the mimodactylid Haopterus. Together, this combination of traits forms the diagnosis of the species, or the list of traits distinguishing it from other known taxa. An additional distinctive trait was described from the pterygoid bone of the palate, but this element was later reinterpreted as the palatine, similar to that of Haopterus.

Though many anhanguerian pterosaurs possessed crests upon their snouts, no such structure is preserved in Linlongopterus and is considered unlikely to be present. The odontoid process of the jaw is tiny, unlike that of istiodactylids as well as ornithocheiform taxa such as Hamipterus and Targaryendraco but similar to Mimodactylus. The front of the mouth possessed several cone shaped teeth, gently curved and relatively large. They are unlike the extremely elongate teeth of anhanguerid taxa such as Guidraco and Liaoningopterus, but rather similar to those of Mimodactylus and Haopterus. Unlike those genera, the teeth lack a cingulum and show slight variation in size. They were likely adapted to facilitate a piscivorous diet, similar to that of other pteranodontoid pterosaurs.

== Classification ==
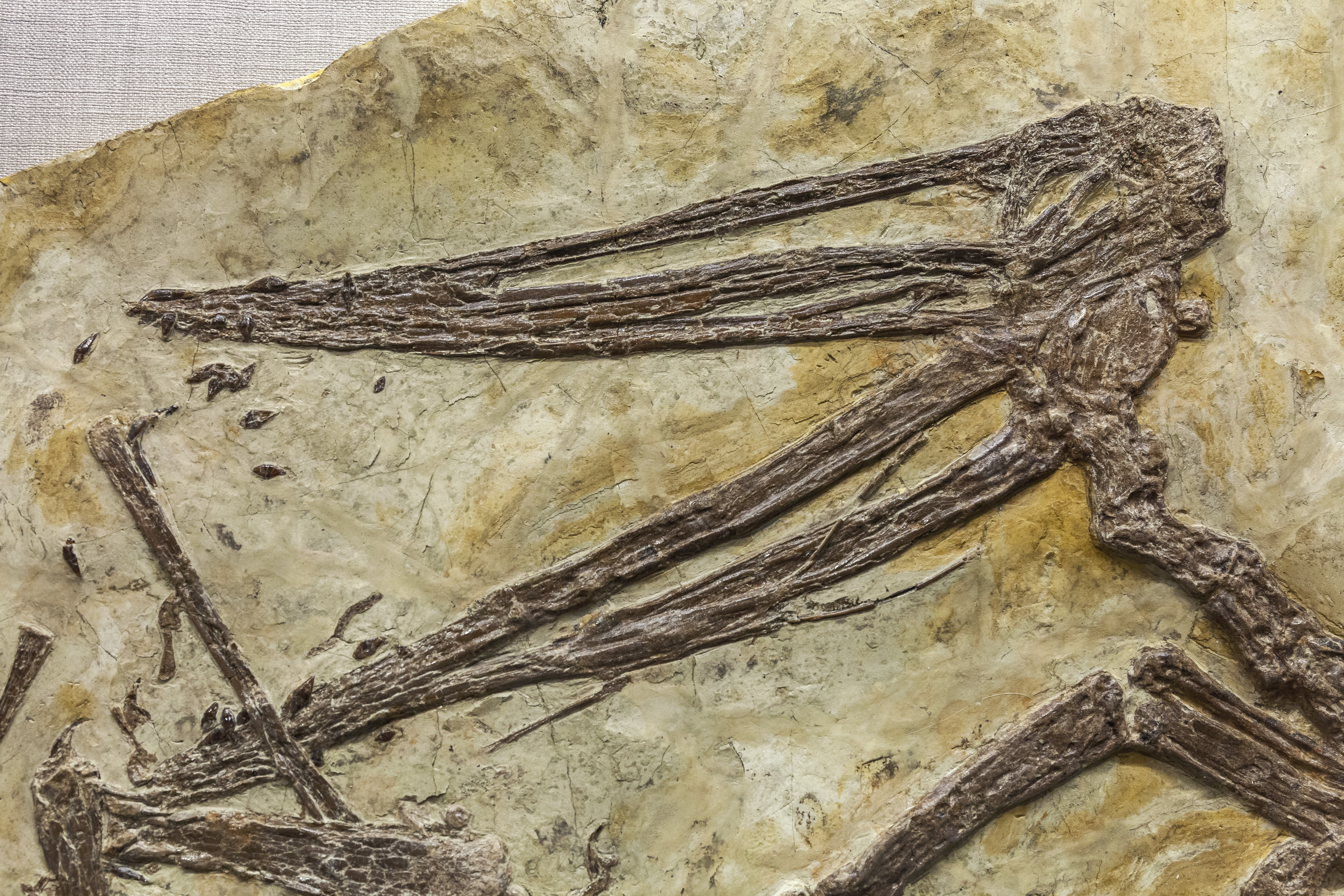
Skull of Haopterus; disagreement surrounds its relation to Linlongopterus

In its 2015 description, Linlongopterus was placed in a phylogenetic analysis to determine its relationships. This resulted in a large polytomy, failing to derive a clear position for the genus. It could only be concluded it fell within the grouping of Azhdarchoidea, Dsungaripteridae, and Pteranodontoidea. Considering the anatomy, an azhdarchoid anatomy was ruled out due to the presence of teeth, and the anatomy of these teeth were not a match for the specialized dentition of dsungaripterids. As such, Linlongopterus was placed within Pteranodontoidea. Within Pteranodontoidea, the dentition also precluded a pteranodontid or istiodactylid identity. It was therefore concluded a position within Anhangueria was most likely, though the lack of jaw crests and relatively uniform tooth size indicated it was not an anhanguerid.

In a 2019 study establishing the genus Mimodactylus, the similar dental anatomy of that pterosaur and its relative Haopterus to Linlongopterus was noted. They tested it in their phylogenetic analysis, but it once again proved to be problematic for resolution and had to removed to achieve a stable tree. The following year a study would include it in their final analysis, and found it unresolved at the base of the clade Istiodactyliformes alongside Mimodactylus and Linlongopterus. Likewise, a 2022 study found it within this group, and specifically nested with those two genera in the family Mimodactylidae. Contrastingly, a 2024 redescription of Haopterus, though noting anatomical similarities between the genus and Linlongopterus, found it to be a primitive member of Ornithocheiriformes, with which it shared variation in its tooth sized, something generally lacking in istiodactyliforms. A cladogram showing the results of the 2022 study is shown below to the left, with that of the 2024 study to the right:

- Pteranodontoidea
  - Pteranodontia
  - Lanceodontia
    - Ornithocheiriformes
    - Istiodactyliformes
      - - Lonchodectes
        - Lonchodraco
        - Ikrandraco
      - - - Haopterus
          - - Mimodactylus
            - Linlongopterus
        - - Hongshanopterus
          - Istiodactylidae

- Pteranodontoidea
  - Pteranodontia
  - Lanceodontia
    - Istiodactyliformes
    - Ornithocheiriformes
      - Linlongopterus
      - - - - Zhenyuanopterus
            - Boreopterus
          - - Aussiedraco
            - - Lonchodectes
              - Targaryendraco
        - - - Iberodactylus
            - Hamipterus
          - - - Barbosania
              - - Cimoliopterus
                - - Camposipterus
                  - Aetodactylus
            - Anhangueria
