= List of fossil Picea species =

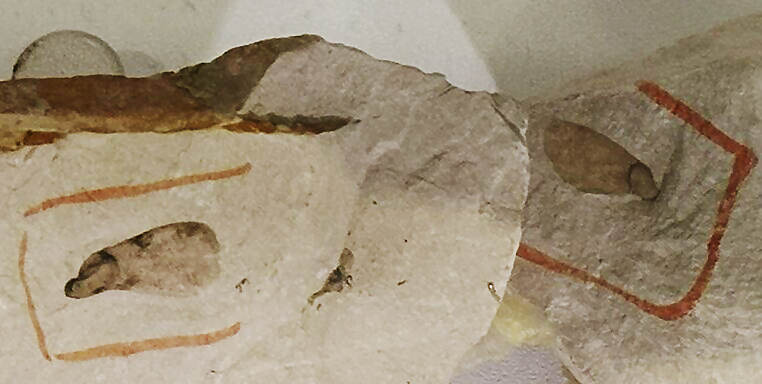
Winged seeds of Picea ugoana. Early Miocene, Niigata Prefecture, Japan

Many extinct Picea (spruce tree) species have been identified from fossil evidence of different plant parts, including cones, leaves, pollen, seeds, and wood. The name of each species is followed by the name of the authority who first described it.

== Cones ==
- †Picea anadyrensis Kryshtofovich
- †Picea antiqua Vasskovsky
- †Picea beckii Mai
- †Picea bilibinii Vasskovsky
- †Picea burtonii Klymiuk & Stockey
- †Picea camtschatica Vasskovsky
- †Picea deweyensis Axelrod
- †Picea diettertiana Miller
- †Picea eichhornii Miller
- †Picea evenica Vasskovsky
- †Picea fimbriata Chelebaeva
- †Picea garoensis Tanai & Suzuki
- †Picea harrimani Knowlton
- †Picea hondoensis Vasskovsky
- †Picea indigirensis Peresvetov
- †Picea latibracteata Miki
- †Picea latisquamosa Kinkelin
- †Picea metechensis Kharatishvili
- †Picea mioorientalis Usnadze
- †Picea mugodzharica Rajushkina
- †Picea oligocaenica Engelhardt
- †Picea pevekensis Golovneva
- †Picea praeajanensis Vasskovsky
- †Picea protopicea (Velenovský) Tyroff
- †Picea sookensis LaMotte
- †Picea sugaii Tanai & Onoe
- †Picea suifunensis Kryshtofovich
- †Picea vassiljevii Vasskovsky
- †Picea vitjasii Vasskovsky
- †Picea wolfei Crabtree
- †Picea wollosowiczii Sukaczev
- †Picea yanensis Golovneva & Shczepetov

== Foliage ==
- †Picea cretacea Velenovský
- †Picea echinata Müller-Stoll
- †Picea korfiensis Chelebaeva
- †Picea lahontensis MacGinitie
- †Picea morosovae Akhmetiev & Shevyreva
- †Picea nakauchii Matsumoto, Ohsawa, & Nishida
- †Picea palaeomorika Müller-Stoll
- †Picea quilchensis Penhallow
- †Picea tranquillensis Penhallow

== Pollen ==
- †Picea alata Zaklinsk
- †Picea bella Bolkhovitina
- †Picea complanatiformis Bolkhovitina
- †Picea depressa Bolkhovitina
- †Picea distorta Bolkhovitina
- †Picea distracta Bolkhovitina
- †Picea exilioides Bolkhovitina
- †Picea gigantissima Bolkhovitina
- †Picea grandipollinia Ananova
- †Picea grandis Panova
- †Picea grandivescipites Wodehouse
- †Picea kryshtofovichii Ammosov
- †Picea longisaccata Rovnina
- †Picea media Ananova
- †Picea mesophytica Pokrovskaja
- †Picea minor Mtchedlishvili
- †Picea multigruma Chlonova
- †Picea omoriciformis Bolkhovitina
- †Picea parvireticulata Rovnina
- †Picea pseudorotundiformis Maljavkina
- †Picea rara Stanley
- †Picea sacculifera (Maljavkina) Chlonova
- †Picea samoilovitchiana Rovnina
- †Picea schrenkianiformis Zaklinskaja
- †Picea scotica Simpson
- †Picea singularis Bolkhovitina
- †Picea spirelliformis (Maljavkina) Bolkhovitina
- †Picea sutschanensis Verbizkaja
- †Picea tasaranica Zaklinskaja
- †Picea tobolica Panova
- †Picea valanjinica Rovnina

== Seeds ==
- †Picea altaica Rajushkina
- †Picea hiyamensis Tanai & Suzuki
- †Picea kaneharae Tanai & Onoe
- †Picea kanoi Huzioka
- †Picea magna MacGinitie
- †Picea pinifructus Brown
- †Picea sonomensis Axelrod

== Wood ==
- †Picea palaeomaximowiczii Watari
- †Picea wakimizui (Watari) Watari
- †Picea withamii (Lindley & Hutton) Morris

== Multiple organs ==
- †Picea columbiensis Penhallow
- †Picea critchfieldii Jackson & Weng - Late Quaternary North America.
- †Picea farjonii Herrera et al.
- †Picea heisseana von Fritsch
- †Picea koribae Miki
- †Picea miocenica Tanai
- †Picea rotundosquamosa (Ludwig) Mai & Walther
- †Picea ugoana Huzioka

== Unspecified ==
- †Picea alba Link
- †Picea albertensis Penhallow
- †Picea snatolensis Chelebaeva

== Fossil species formerly placed in Picea ==
- †Picea cliffwoodensis Berry moved to †Pityostrobus cliffwoodensis (Bery) Miller
- †Picea succinifera (Göppert & Berendt) moved to Pinus succinifera (Göppert) Conwentz
