= Acer eonegundo =

Acer eonegundo Temporal range: Middle Eocene – Late Eocene

Scientific classification
- Kingdom: Plantae
- Clade: Tracheophytes
- Clade: Angiosperms
- Clade: Eudicots
- Clade: Rosids
- Order: Sapindales
- Family: Sapindaceae
- Genus: Acer
- Section: Acer sect. Negundo
- Species: †A. eonegundo

Binomial name
- †Acer eonegundo Wolfe & Tanai, 1987

Extinct species of maple

Acer eonegundo is an extinct maple species in the family Sapindaceae described from a single partial fossil leaf. The species is known from Eocene sediments exposed in the US state of Nevada. It is placed into the living Acer section Negundo.

== History and classification ==
A. eonegundo is represented by a solitary fossil specimen from the northeastern part of Nevada. The specimen was recovered from an outcrop of the "Bull Run" flora, University of California Museum of Paleontology location P562, which preserves lacustrine sedimentation associated with extensive intermittent volcanism between 43 to 38 million years ago. Radiometric dating of volcanic ash layers above and below the flora reported in 1966 indicated an age of approximately 41 million years ago. The Bull Run, Copper Basin, and Elko floras were formed during the same time frame as a result of the volcanic activity. The three floras are possibly tied to the Salmon and Cow Creek floras of Central Idaho, and also possibly with the John Day Formations Sheep rock flora in Oregon.

The holotype for A. eonegundo is a part specimen numbered UCMP 9043, which at the time of description was preserved in the University of California Museum of Paleontology in Berkeley, California. The specimen was studied by paleobotanists Jack A. Wolfe of the United States Geological Survey, Denver office and Toshimasa Tanai of Hokkaido University, with Wolfe and Tanai publishing their 1987 type description for A. taurocursum in the Journal of the Faculty of Science, Hokkaido University. The etymology of the chosen specific name eonegundo is a combination of negundo for Acer section Negundo and "eo" for Eocene, alluding to the species being an Eocene member of the section.

A. eonegundo is one of six Acer species to be described by Wolfe and Tanai in 1987 from the "Bull Run" flora, with the others being A. axelrodi, A. cadaver, A. elkoanum, A. eomediunum, and A. taurocursum. While A. eonegundo is only described form foliage, A. taurocursum and A. cadaver are described only from fruits. A. axelrodi, A. elkoanum, and A. eomediunum are known from both leaves and fruits. When described, Wolfe and Tanai noted A. eonegundo to be the oldest leaf fossil record for the A. sect. Negundo, with relationships between A. eonegundo the younger members of the section unclear.

== Description ==
A. eonegundo has compound leaves divided into at least three leaflets, with the leaflets pinnately veined and ranging up to 4.8 cm (1.9 in) in length. The leaflets have small petiolules and asymmetric bases flaring out on the basal side while remaining narrow on the apical side. Each lateral leaflet has 7 secondary veins that fork near the leaf margin with the inner branch curving upwards to join the next secondary vein up, while the outer fork extends to the leaf margin. The outer forks brace the sinuses between the teeth on the blade margins. Overall the teeth of the leaflets compound, each of the large teeth having 1 to 2 smaller teeth on the basal side. The leaves have tertiary veins that form acute angle-right angle structuring with the veins spaced 0.7–1.3 cm (0.28–0.51 in) apart. The quaternary veins form a network of areoles that are irregular polygons.
