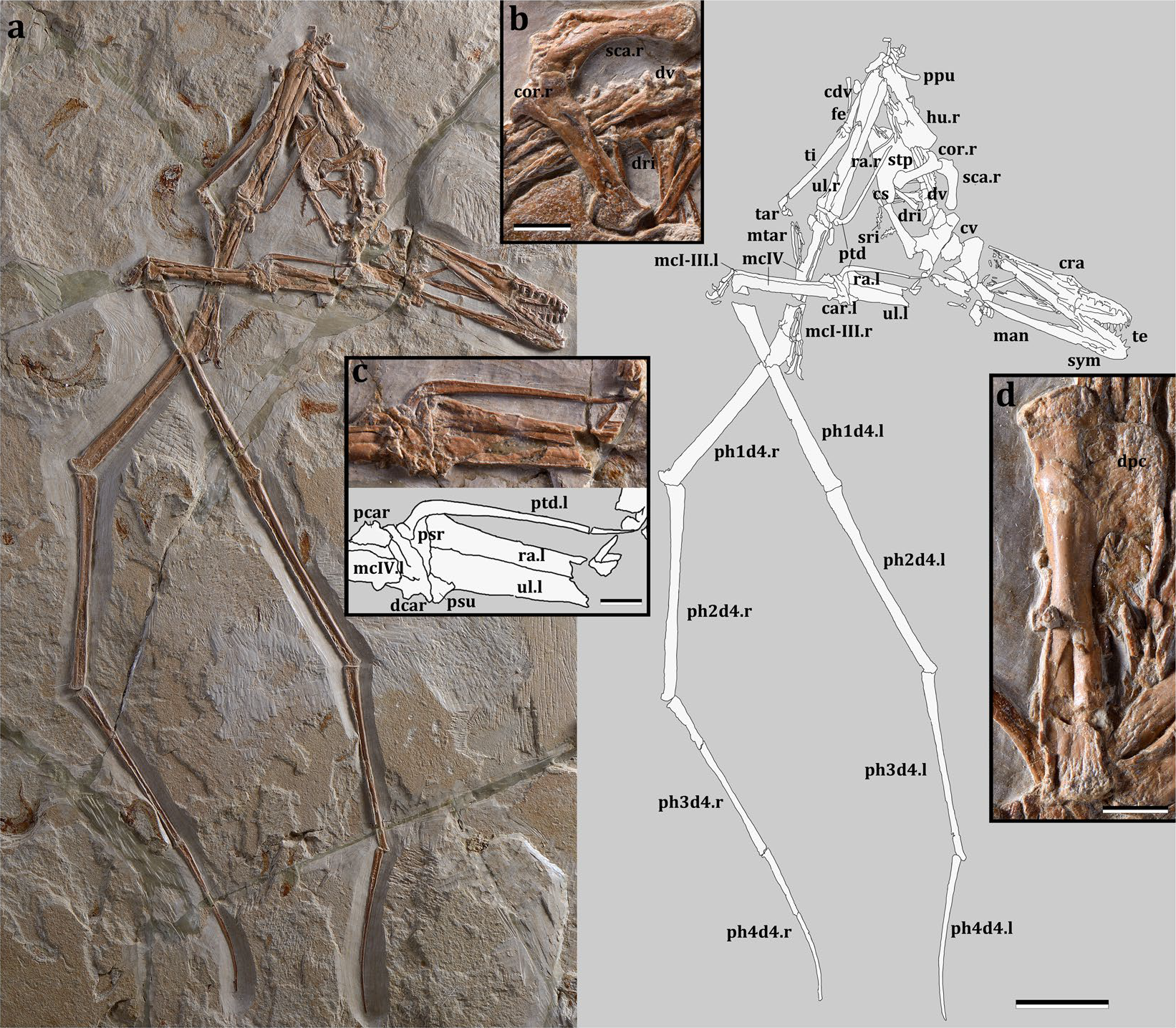
- Holotype specimen with interpretive drawing and inset close-ups of the scapula and coracoid (b), wrist (c), and humerus (d)

Scientific classification
- Kingdom: Animalia
- Phylum: Chordata
- Class: Reptilia
- Order: †Pterosauria
- Suborder: †Pterodactyloidea
- Clade: †Istiodactyliformes
- Clade: †Mimodactylidae
- Genus: †Mimodactylus; Kellner et al., 2019
- Species: †M. libanensis

Binomial name
- †Mimodactylus libanensis Kellner et al., 2019

= Mimodactylus =

Mimodactylus Temporal range: Late Cretaceous, 95 Ma

Genus of Late Cretaceous pterosaur

Mimodactylus is a genus of istiodactyliform pterosaur that lived in what is now Lebanon during the Late Cretaceous, 95 million years ago. The only known specimen was discovered in a limestone quarry near the town of Hjoula, belonging to the Sannine Formation. The owner of the quarry allowed the specimen to be prepared and scientifically described by an international team of researchers. When it was eventually sold, the buyer donated it to the MIM Museum in Beirut. In 2019, the researchers named the new genus and species Mimodactylus libanensis; the generic name refers to the MIM Museum, combined with the Greek word daktylos for "digit", and the specific name refers to Lebanon. The well-preserved holotype specimen is the first complete pterosaur from the Afro-Arabian continent (which consisted of the then joined Arabian Peninsula and Africa), and the third pterosaur fossil known from Lebanon.

The holotype specimen is comparatively small, with a wingspan of 1.32 metres (4.3 ft), and was probably a young individual. Its snout is broad and the cone-shaped teeth are confined to the front half of the jaws. The tooth crowns are compressed sideways and have a cingulum (a thickened ridge at the base), and lack sharp carinae (cutting edges). The skeleton is distinctive in that the deltopectoral crest of the humerus (ridge for attachment of the deltoid and pectoral muscles) is rectangular and that the humerus is less than half the length of the wing-finger's second phalanx bone. The describers of Mimodactylus classified it in the new clade Mimodactylidae along with Haopterus, this group being part of Istiodactyliformes. The teeth of Mimodactylus suggest its feeding habits differed from other pterosaurs. Possibly it foraged for decapod crustaceans from water surfaces. The marine deposits of Hjoula are late Cenomanian in age and are well known for fish fossils. Lebanon was submerged in the Neotethys ocean at the time, but some small islands were exposed.

== History of discovery ==
The only known specimen of this pterosaur was collected from a private limestone quarry near the town of Hjoula, Lebanon, more than fifteen years before its 2019 scientific description. Hjoula is located 35 km (22 mi) northeast of the capital Beirut and 10 km (6.2 mi) inland from the city of Byblos. The locality is considered a Lagerstätte, a place with fossils of exceptional preservation, and belongs to the Sannine Formation, which dates to the late Cenomanian age of the Cretaceous period. Lebanese Cretaceous deposits have been known for well-preserved fish and invertebrates since the Middle Ages, but fossils of tetrapod (ancestrally four-limbed) animals are very rare. Information about Mesozoic fossils of the Afro-Arabian continent (which consisted of the then joined Arabian Peninsula and Africa, also known as the Arabo-African palaeocontinent) is generally very limited, with only South Africa having been systematically studied.

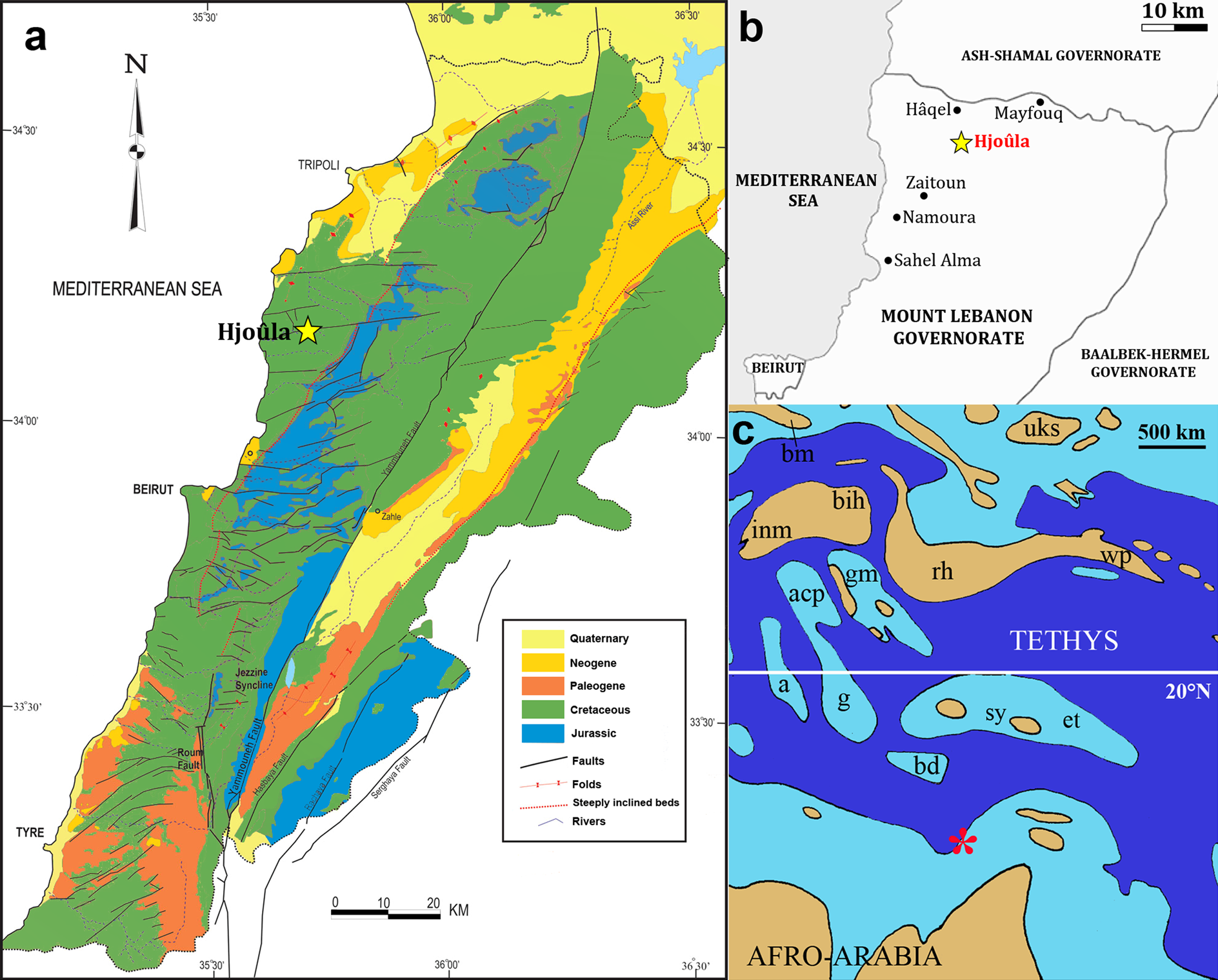
Map showing Hjoula (a-b) and position of Lebanon during the late Cenomanian (c)

The very fragile but well-preserved pterosaur specimen was split in two pieces when discovered on the limestone slab, and apart from a fracture caused by the pickaxe of a quarry worker, its skull was intact, as were the wings, legs, and body. The owner of the quarry allowed a team of researchers from the University of Alberta in Canada to prepare and describe the specimen, while intending for the fossil to be eventually sold, which is legal in Lebanon. The palaeontological community in Lebanon lacked the technology needed to prepare the fossil material in a way that would most effectively reveal information from the specimen. The specimen spent about eight years at the University of Alberta, where it was prepared, assembled, and studied. Subsequently, the owner of the quarry sold the specimen, but around 2016, after years of negotiations, the anonymous buyer donated it to the MIM Museum, hosted at the Saint Joseph University of Beirut, so that it could be kept in Lebanon.

The Canadian palaeontologists Michael W. Caldwell and Philip J. Currie teamed up with an international group of researchers to scientifically describe the specimen, including the Brazilians Alexander W. A. Kellner, Borja Holgado, and Juliana M. Sayão, Italian Fabio M. Dalla Vecchia, and Lebanese Roy Nohra (Kellner and Dalla Vecchia had previously done fieldwork in Lebanon together). In interviews, the researchers expressed pleasure in the specimen being returned to Lebanon, where it can be used for education and research, and in having the opportunity to collaborate internationally. The majority of fossil type specimens (on which scientific names are based) from Lebanon are stored in collections outside the country, and Lebanese researchers are typically not included in publications about Lebanese fossils; a 2024 study therefore concluded Lebanon is impacted by scientific colonialism.

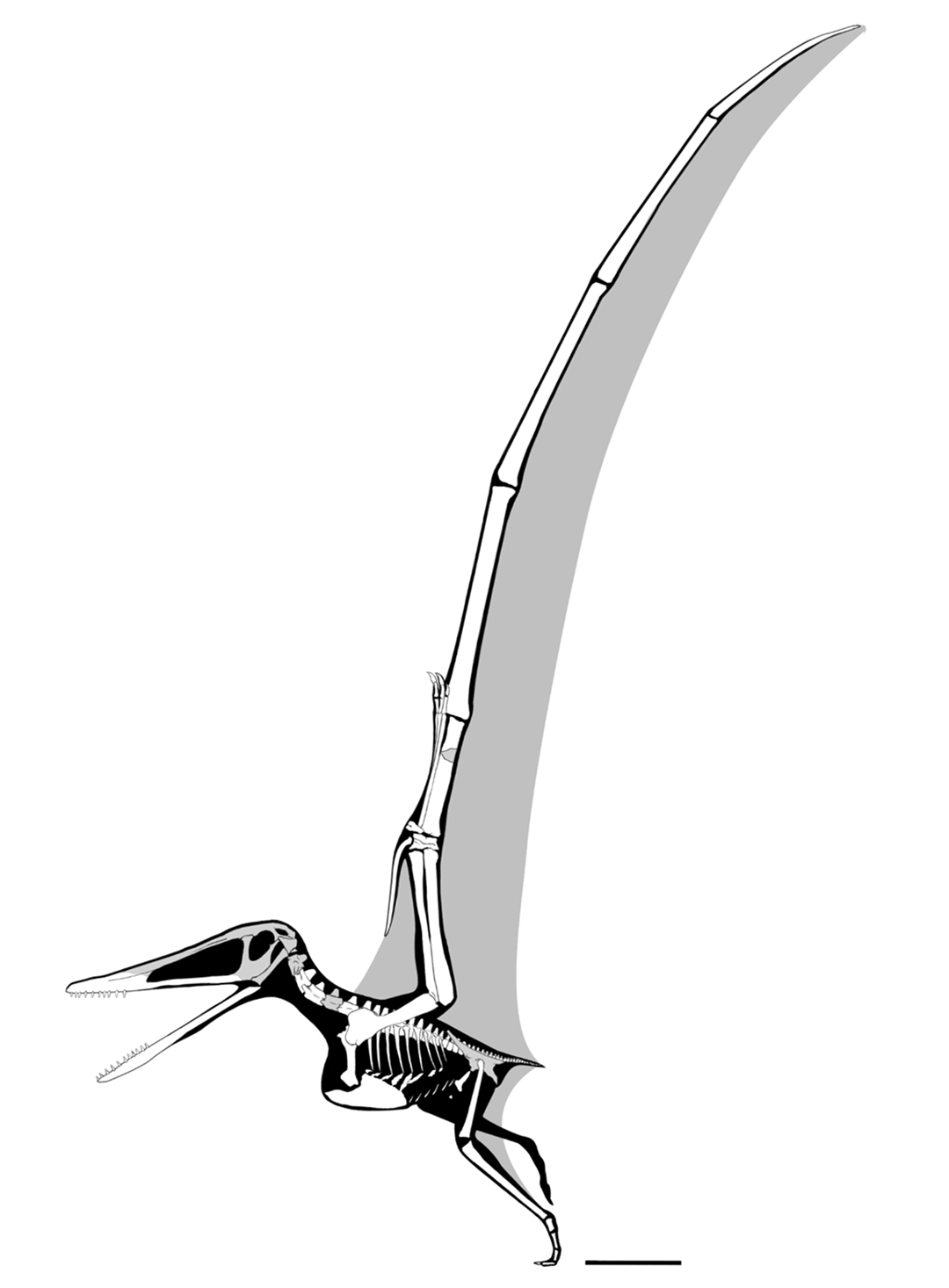
Skeletal diagram; the scale bar is 50 mm (2.0 in).

In 2019, Kellner and colleagues named the new genus and species Mimodactylus libanensis; the generic name refers to the MIM Museum, in recognition of where the specimen is housed and according to the wishes of the philanthropist who acquired the specimen, combined with the Greek word daktylos (δάκτυλος) for "digit". The specific name refers to Lebanon. The holotype specimen is catalogued as MIM F1, and casts are present at the University of Alberta and the National Museum of Brazil. The holotype skeleton is well-preserved and mostly articulated, with some bones slightly displaced from their anatomical position; the skull and lower jaw are exposed from below, and the occipital region at the back of the skull and the jaw joint flattened.

The holotype is the first complete and articulated pterosaur specimen known from the Afro-Arabian continent, which had otherwise only yielded a few fragmentary specimens. The previous most completely known pterosaur specimens from the continent were also from Lebanon: a partial forelimb of an unnamed ornithocheiroid (catalogued as MSNM V 3881) from the Hakel Lagerstätte of the same age, and Microtuban, an azhdarchoid consisting mainly of the wings and shoulder girdle, also from Hjoula. Although these specimens are less complete, their anatomical features can be clearly distinguished from Mimodactylus. The specimen has become the centrepiece of the fossil vertebrate collection at the MIM Museum, where it is nicknamed "Mimo" and is exhibited alongside a hologram, a movie, a life-sized reconstruction, and a game.

== Description ==
The only known Mimodactylus specimen is comparatively small, with a wingspan of 1.32 m (4.3 ft). It was probably a young individual when it died, based on some bones not being fused; the dentary bones (teeth-bearing bones of the lower jaw) are fused at the mandibular symphysis, where the two halves of the lower jaw connect at the front. This indicates the specimen had reached an ontogenetic (growth) stage between stages 2 and 3 out of 6, according to a system for determining the age of pterosaur fossils devised by Kellner in 2015 (some bones of vertebrate animals fuse at different rates as they age). The adult size of Mimodactylus is unknown. As a pterosaur, Mimodactylus would have been covered in hair-like pycnofibres, and had extensive wing-membranes, which were distended by the long wing-finger. In an interview, Caldwell described Mimodactylus as having long, narrow wings, but with a body the size of a sparrow, a head longer than its body, and being rather like "wings with a mouth".

=== Skull ===
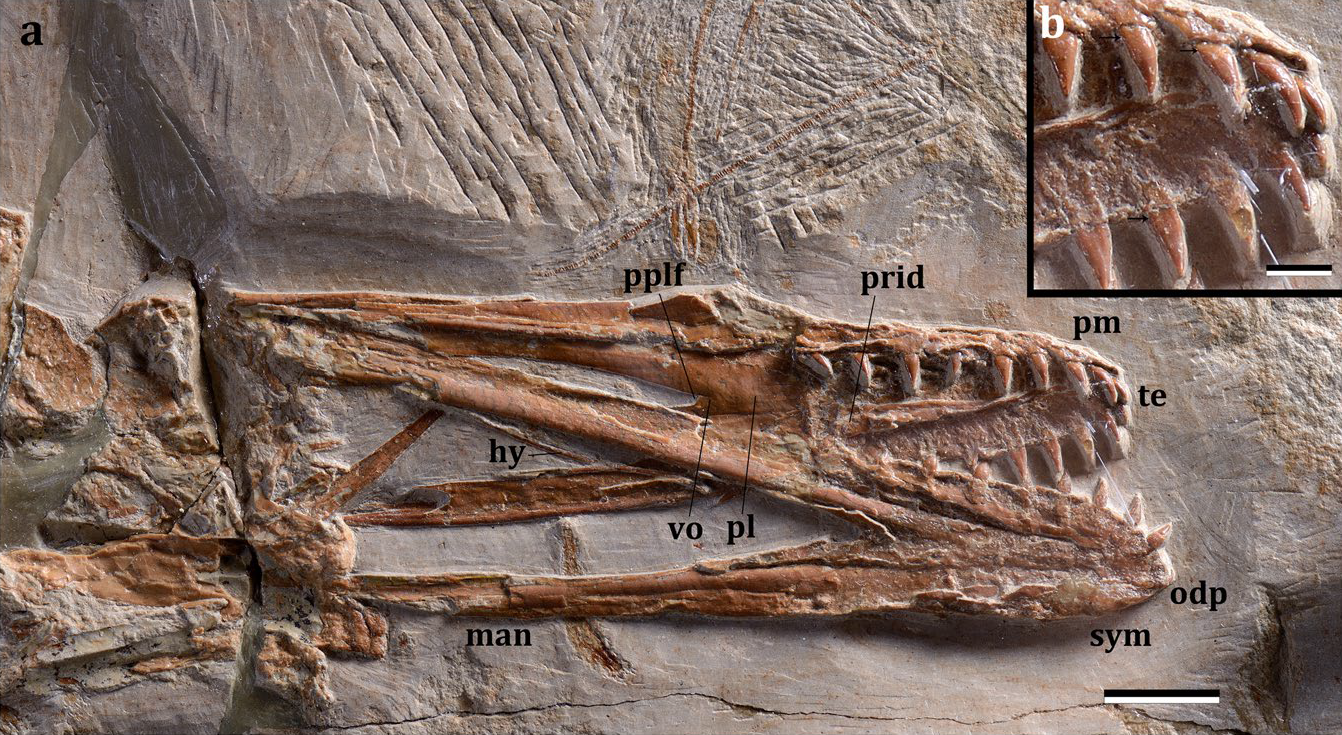
Skull and jaws, with inset close-up of the upper front teeth

The preserved part of the skull of Mimodactylus is 99 mm (3.9 in) long, and the preserved part of the lower jaw is 105 mm (4.1 in). The rostrum (snout) is broad when seen from above and has a pointed tip, and not rounded as in the istiodactylid Istiodactylus, and also differs from other istiodactyliforms, the group they both belonged to. The upper jaws have eleven cone-shaped teeth on each side, and the lower jaws have ten on each side, and the teeth are confined to the front half of the jaws, as in the related Haopterus and Linlongopterus. A similar configuration is also seen in other istiodactyliforms.

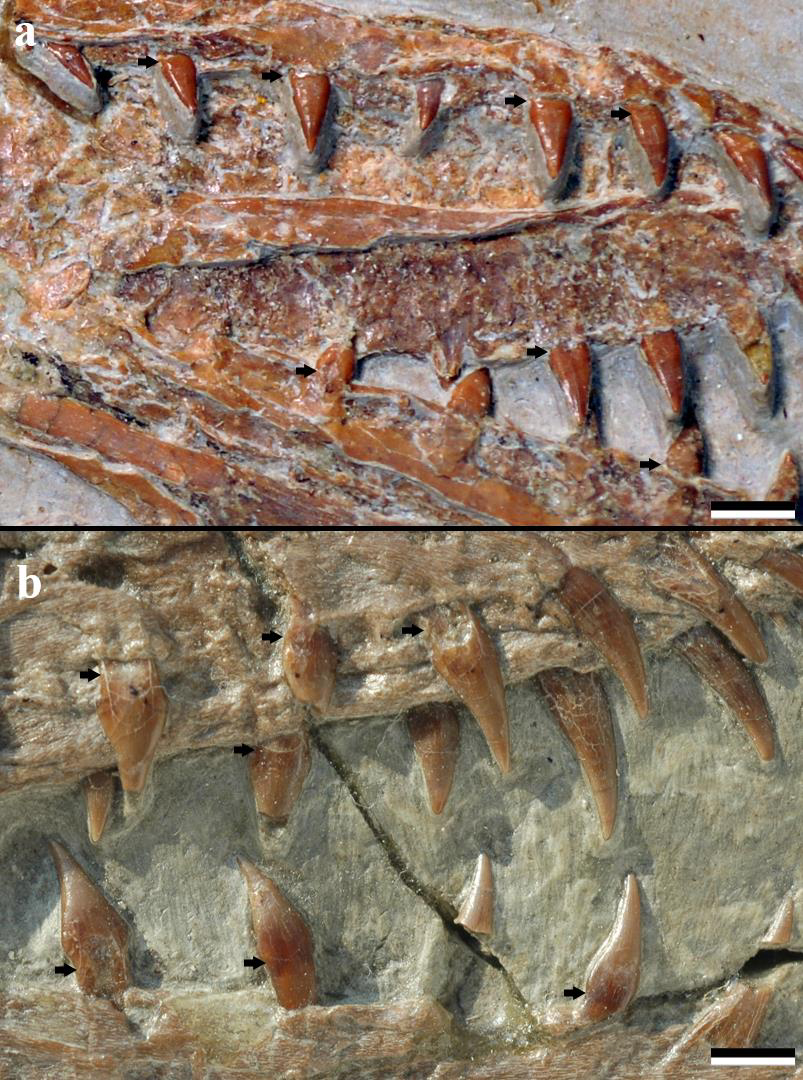
Teeth (a, above) compared to those of the related Haopterus

The tooth crowns are compressed sideways and have a cingulum (a thickened ridge at the crown base), as in Haopterus and other istiodactyliforms. A cingulum is also known from the teeth of istiodactylids and related pterosaurs, but these have wide crowns, which are also compressed sideways. Mimodactylus does not have the lancet-shaped teeth with sideways compressed crowns which are characteristic of istiodactylids, though, and also lacks the sharp carinae (cutting edges) seen in Istiodactylus. The first upper tooth of Mimodactylus is small, with an almost circular cross-section, and the following teeth are the largest of the upper jaw, and have slightly sideways compressed crowns with a cingulum, convex outer surfaces, and thin, needle-like tips which are inclined inwards.

The dentition of Mimodactylus is similar to that of more basal (or "primitive") archaeopterodactyloid pterosaurs such as Pterodactylus and Germanodactylus, and the only other derived (or "advanced") pterodactyloid with comparable teeth is Haopterus. The palate of Mimodactylus is concave and has a small palatal ridge, and the choanae (internal nostrils) are large and separated by the vomers. The postpalatinal fenestra (opening behind the palate) is elongated and egg-shaped, as in Hongshanopterus. The lower jaws have an odontoid (or "pseudo-tooth") process at the tip, as seen in Istiodactylus, Haopterus, and Lonchodraco. The ceratobranchials of the hyoid (tongue bone) are thin, elongated, and fork-shaped.

=== Postcranial skeleton ===
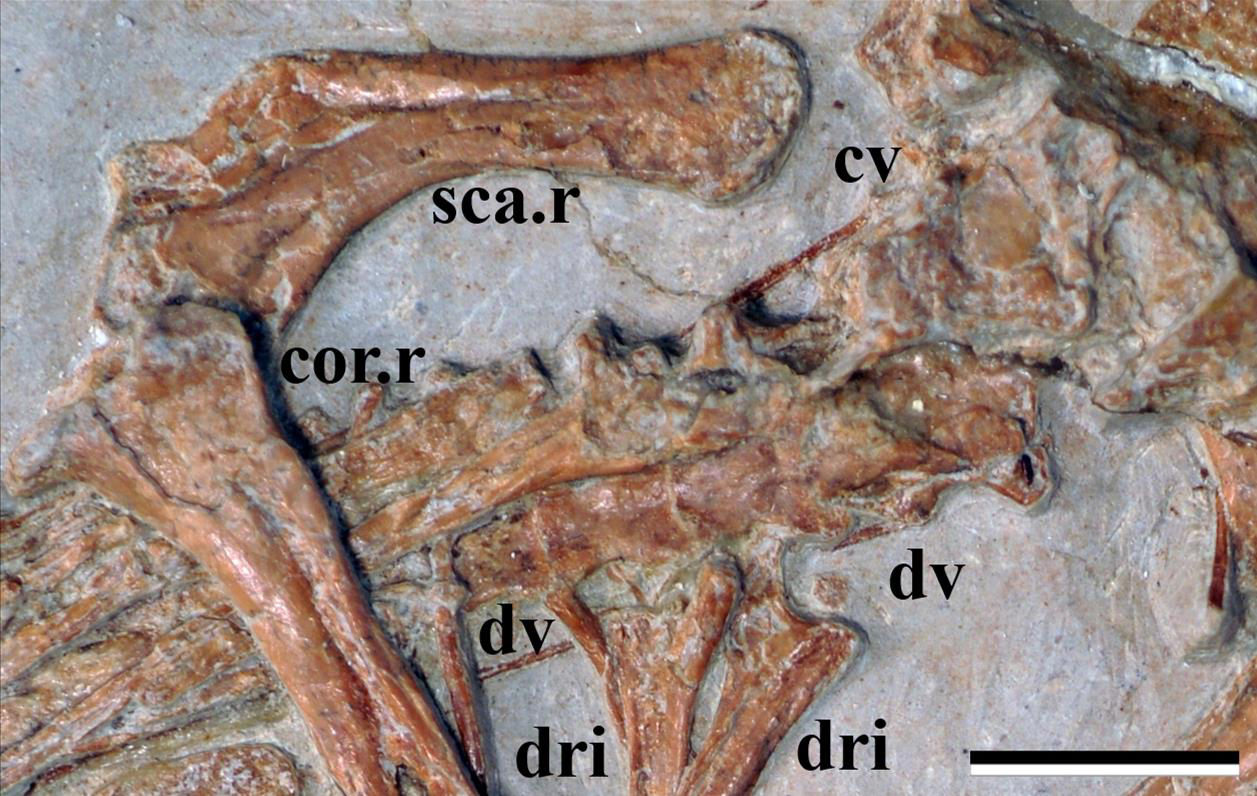
The dorsal vertebrae of the back near the right scapula and coracoid

The front dorsal vertebrae of the back are not fused into a notarium (a feature present in other pterosaurs) in Mimodactylus. Seven caudal vertebrae of the tail are visible, which lack a duplex centrum, and quickly diminish in size towards the rear, indicating that the tail of this species was very short. The cristospine (central crest) on the underside of the sternum (breast bone) is comparatively short and deep, similar to those of Nurhachius and Istiodactylus. The front part of the sternum was more rounded when seen in side view than in istiodactylids, and thereby more similar to those of anhanguerids. When complete, the sternal plate would have been square in shape overall, and probably had a straight side edge and convex hind margin. The scapula (shoulder blade) is 29 mm (1.1 in) long. It is stout and has a constricted shaft, as in istiodactylids and anhanguerids, but differs in being somewhat longer than the coracoid (part of the shoulder girdle). The coracoid is 31 mm (1.2 in) long. The articulation between the coracoid and the sternum is slightly concave as in Haopterus, with a backward protrusion that is not seen in istiodactylids.

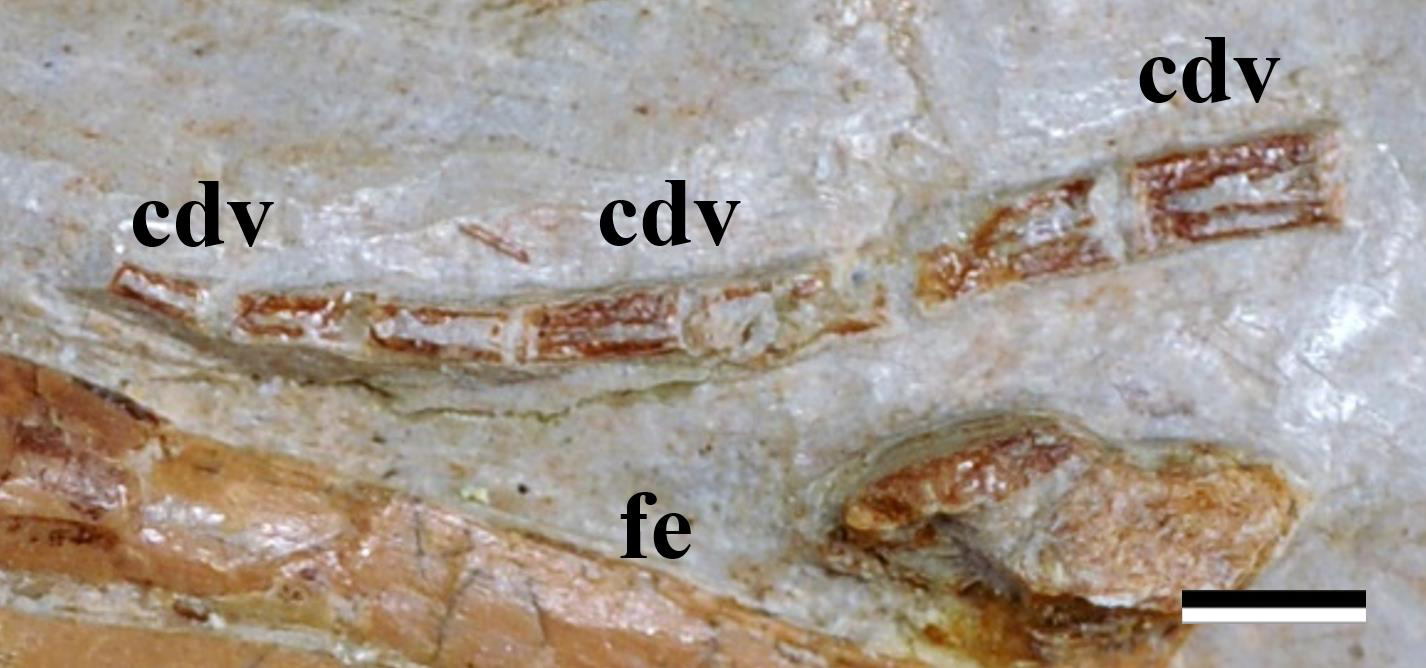
The caudal vertebrae of the tail

The humerus (upper arm bone) of Mimodactylus is 52 mm (2.0 in) long. The deltopectoral crest of the humerus (ridge for attachment of the deltoid and pectoral muscles) is distinctive (an autapomorphy) in being rectangular, and has an unusual, straight, lower edge. This crest extends 40% of the humeral shaft's length, more than what is seen in all other ornithocheiroids, except Pteranodon and its relatives. The ulna (a lower arm bone) is 84 mm (3.3 in) long. Some of the wing-bones are longer in relation to the humerus than in istiodactylids, especially the first two phalanx bones of the wing-finger; the humerus is unique in being less than half the length of the second phalanx. The first wing phalanx is 128 mm (5.0 in) long, the second 119 mm (4.7 in), the third 105 mm (4.1 in), and the fourth 92 mm (3.6 in). The outer part of the wing-finger's last phalanx is curved, as in most pterosaurs.

The pteroid bone (a hand-bone unique to pterosaurs which supported the front wing-membrane or propatagium) of Mimodactylus is rather large, and longer than the humerus at 53 mm (2.1 in). The pteroid clearly articulated with the proximal syncarpal and pointed towards the body; the position of the pteroid in pterosaurs had been a point of contention among researchers, but was settled due to the perfect articulation of the forelimbs in Mimodactylus. The humerus is much longer than the femur (thighbone), the preserved part of which is 36 mm (1.4 in) long. The tibiotarsus (lower-leg bone) is 60 mm (2.4 in) long. As in istiodactylids, the feet are relatively small. The exact combination of its various anatomical features also distinguishes Mimodactylus from other ornithocheiroids.

== Classification ==
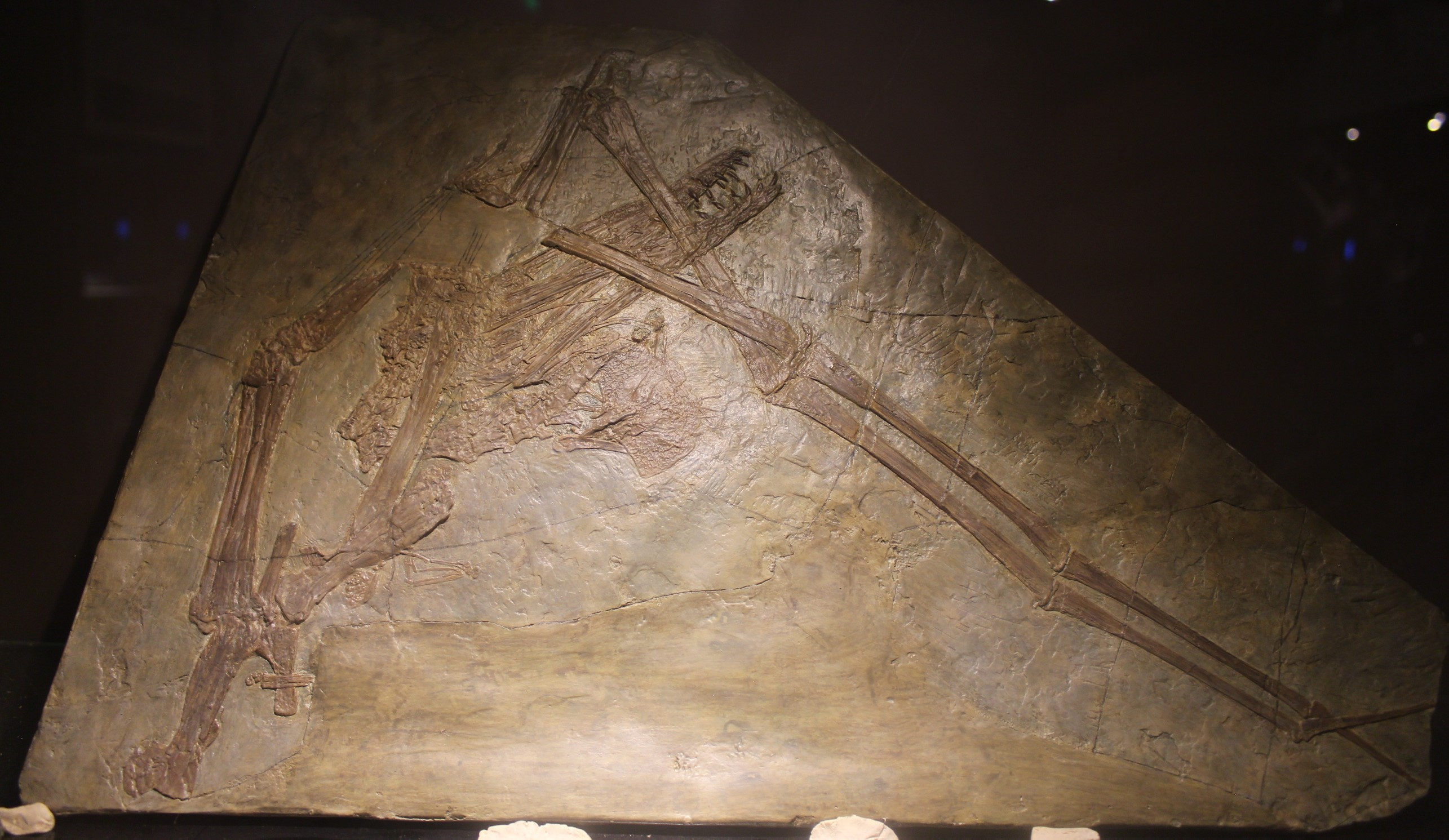
Holotype of the related Haopterus, a fellow member of Mimodactylidae

In their 2019 phylogenetic analysis, Kellner and colleagues found Mimodactylus to be most closely related to Haopterus (a genus from China previously classified in several groups). The two genera formed a clade within the group Lanceodontia, for which they coined the name Mimodactylidae. These researchers characterised mimodactylids by features such as cone-shaped teeth in the upper jaws, crowns slightly compressed sideways, the articular surfaces of the coracoids that connected with the sternum being slightly concave, and widely spaced teeth confined to the front half of the jaws.

Kellner and colleagues found Mimodactylidae to be most closely related to Istiodactylidae and grouped the two together in the new clade Istiodactyliformes. They excluded the possibly related Linlongopterus from their analysis for being a "wildcard taxon" (of uncertain placement that changes between analyses). They noted that Mimodactylus is the first istiodactyliform known from Gondwana (the southern supercontinent which included Africa and Arabia), members of the group previously being only known from Early Cretaceous sites in Europe and Asia.

The cladogram below shows the position of Mimodactylus and Mimodactylidae within Istiodactyliformes according to Kellner and colleagues, 2019:

- Pteranodontoidea
  - Pteranodontia
  - Lanceodontia
    - Istiodactyliformes
      - Mimodactylidae
        - Haopterus
        - Mimodactylus
      - - Hongshanopterus
        - Istiodactylidae
          - Nurhachius
          - Istiodactylinae
            - Istiodactylus
            - Liaoxipterus
    - - Ikrandraco
      - - Lonchodraco
        - Ornithocheirae

A 2021 study by the Chinese paleontologist Jiang Shunxing and colleagues found Mimodactylus in a polytomy (a group that is unresolved due to having more than two branches) with Haopterus, Yixianopterus, and Linlongopterus. The Chinese paleontologist Yizhi Xu and colleagues found Mimodactylus to be the sister taxon of Linlongopterus in 2022, with Haopterus at the base of their clade. The American palaeontologist Gregory S. Paul considered Yixianopterus part of Mimodactylidae in 2022. A 2023 article by the British paleontologist Steven C. Sweetman noted that Mimodactylus was the latest occurring member of Istiodactyliformes.

== Palaeobiology ==
=== Feeding and diet ===
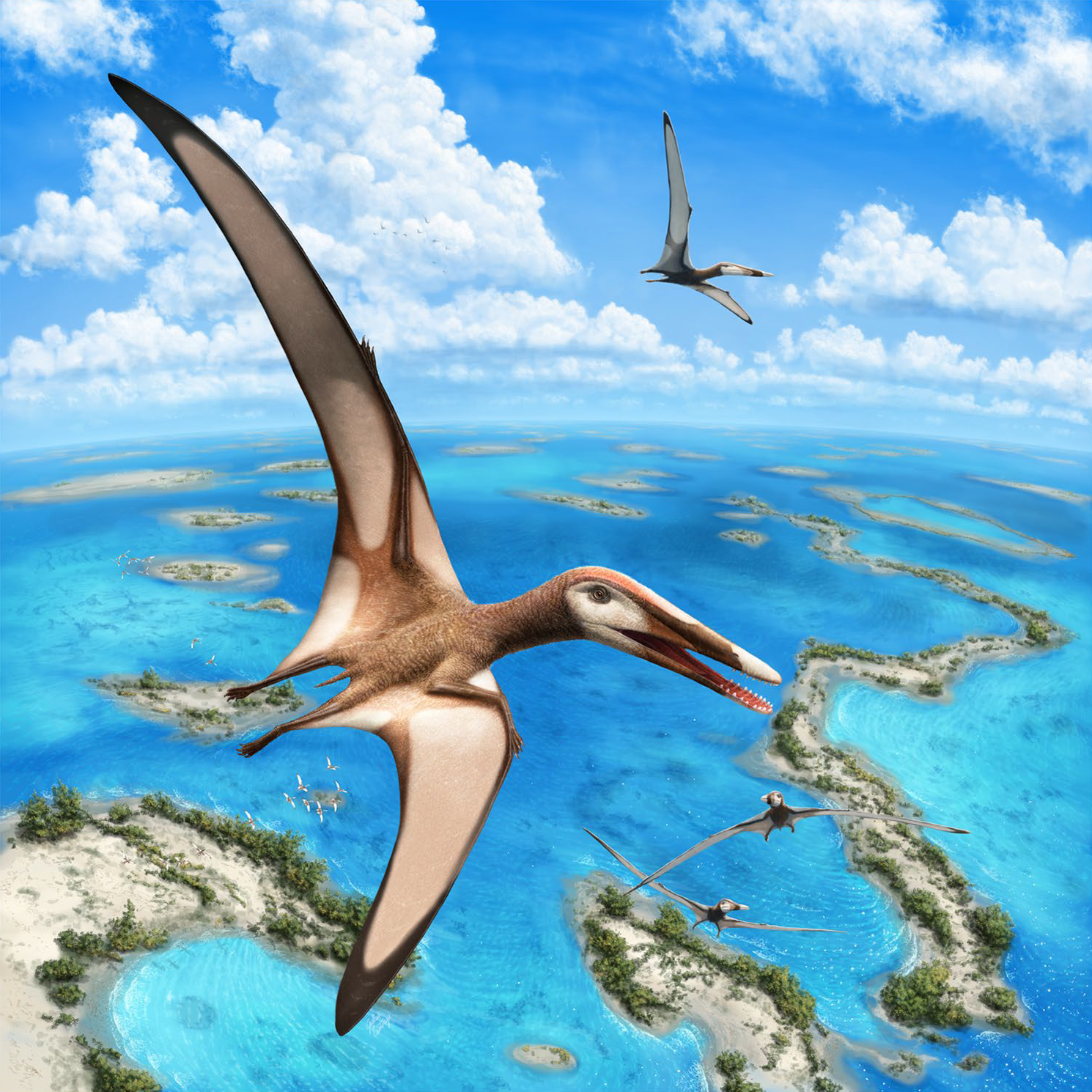
Life restoration of Mimodactylus in its environment, by Julius Csotonyi

As they have no modern analogues, it is difficult to determine the diet of pterosaurs. Suggestions have been made for the derived groups based on their dentition, such as piscivory, frugivory, durophagy, insectivory, and in the case of the related Istiodactylus, scavenging. As the dentition of Mimodactylus differs from all of these, Kellner and colleagues suggested in 2019 that it probably had different feeding habits. Insectivorous species often have slim teeth that can more easily break down arthropods, and among pterosaurs, anurognathids are thought to be adapted for this with their well-spaced, isodont (of equal length) teeth. Though Mimodactylus had wider teeth, they may otherwise have fitted this mode of feeding by being able to break down the exoskeletons of arthropods.

Extant vertebrate animals that feed on insects while flying have short wings with low aspect ratios that make them highly manoeuvrable in the air, unlike Mimodactylus, which had long wings with a high aspect ratio. The ability to manoeuvre during flight appears to have been limited in Mimodactylus as in open-sea fliers, and it was probably highly stable when flying, like albatrosses and some other birds. Such dynamic soaring (flying with little flapping) may also have been the mode of flying of large pterosaurs such as anhanguerians, istiodactylids and pteranodontians. Kellner and colleagues therefore suggested that instead of being insectivorous, Mimodactylus and its relatives may have foraged for decapod crustaceans from water surfaces, similar to how some albatrosses feed on shrimp. The broad rostrum and widely spaced, relatively robust, and pointed teeth of Mimodactylus would have been helpful for seizing shrimp in the water.

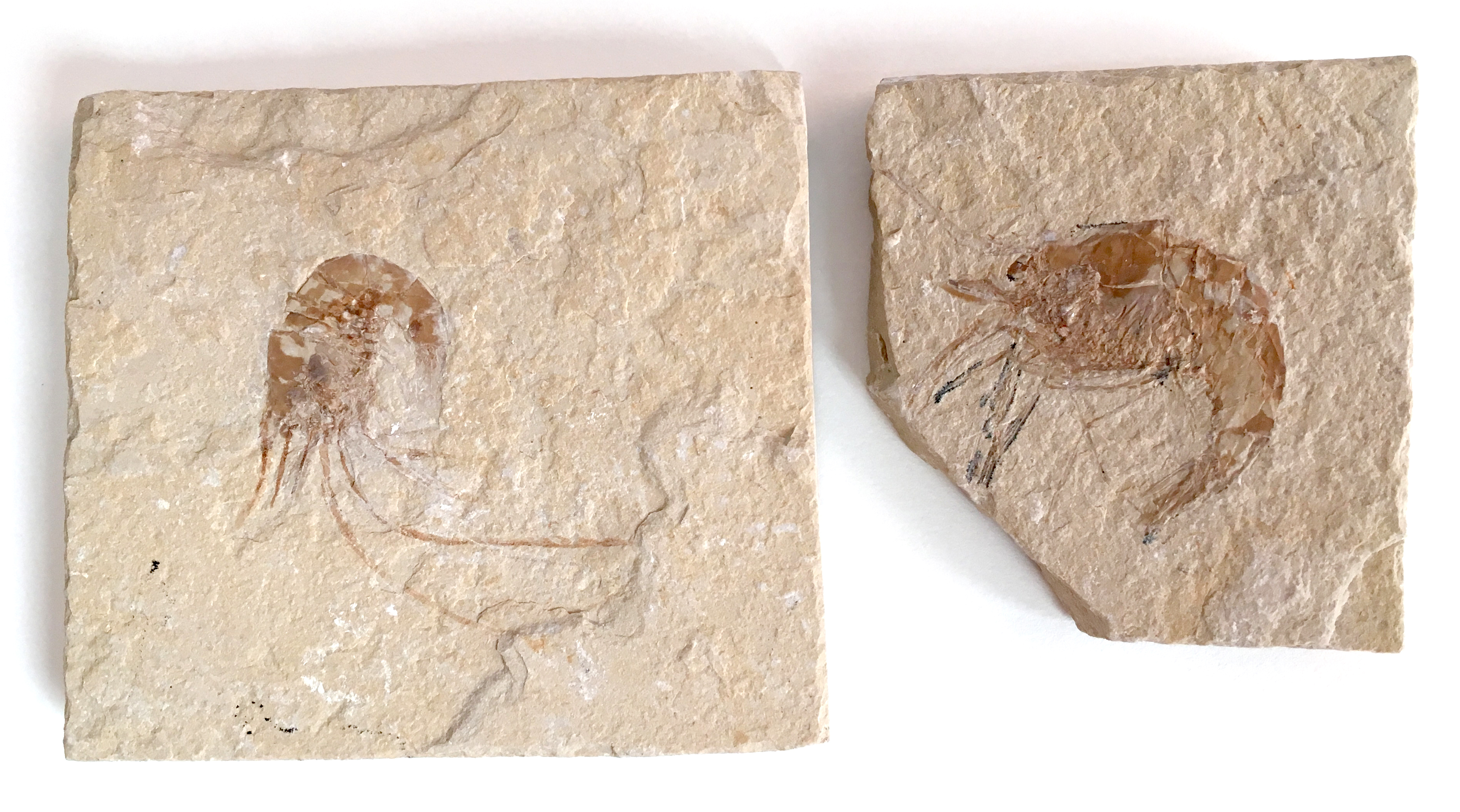
Fossils of Carpopenaeus, a genus of shrimp known from Hjoula; it has been proposed that Mimodactylus fed on such decapod crustaceans

Insects had not been discovered at Hjoula or the other Cretaceous Lagerstätten of Lebanon by the time Mimodactylus was described, and fossils of terrestrial plants are very rare at Hjoula. This indicated to Kellner and colleagues that the area was very far from land, and the continent several hundreds of kilometres away. They stated that Mimodactylus lived in archipelagos and scattered islands situated on the plateau extending into the Neotethys ocean. Decapod crustaceans are the most common invertebrate fossils found at Hjoula, and fish and zooplankton could also have provided food for pterosaurs in the area. Kellner and colleagues noted that although insectivory could not be ruled out, the broad rostrum of Mimodactylus was consistent with a faunivorous diet, or primarily a diet of crustaceans, like in some extant ducks, boat-billed herons, and shoebills. They concluded that this expanded the spectrum of feeding strategies known in derived pterodactyloid pterosaurs.

The first two fossil dragonfly species from Lebanon (including Libanoliupanshania mimi, also named for the MIM Museum) and a beetle were reported by the Lebanese palaeontologist Dany Azar and colleagues in 2019, showing that Hjoula does have potential for preserving insects. The describers pointed out that it is unusual to find only large insect fossils in marine outcrops, but noted that quarry workers at Hjoula are used to collecting larger fossils, such as fish, so collection bias may have occurred (as is also the case in Jurassic outcrops of Bavaria, where dragonflies are more frequently collected than other insects). There may also be taphonomic bias in favour of preserving strong fliers. These researchers stated that although the Hjoula outcrop represents a marine environment, fossils of terrestrial organisms (including the then newly discovered insects and pterosaurs) indicate they were deposited close to a shoreline during the early late Cenomanian. More insects have since been discovered in Hjoula, supporting the idea that the area was close to the shore at the time.

== Palaeoenvironment ==
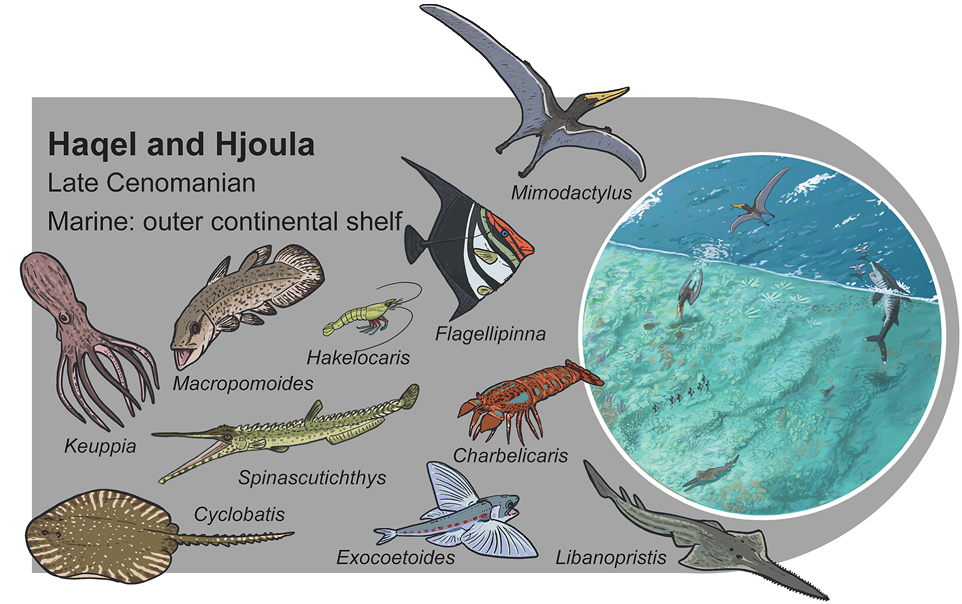
Fauna and depositional environment of the coeval Hakel and Hjoula localities, including Mimodactylus

Mimodactylus is known from the Sannine Formation in Hjoula, Lebanon, which is dated to the late Cenomanian age of the Late Cretaceous, about 95 million years ago. This age was determined via biostratigraphy, by comparing with fossils from localities elsewhere in the world whose dates are known. Lebanon was mostly submerged on a large, shallow carbonate platform during the middle Cenomanian, which bordered the northeastern part of the Afro-Arabian continent with the Neotethys ocean, but some small islands were exposed. Deposits of the Hjoula outcrops are marine, but terrestrial fossils indicate that it was close to a palaeoshore during the late Cenomanian. The limestone of Hajoula is compact, soft, and laminated rock, which is characterised by being light yellow or grey-yellow, and in not having flint nodules.

The Cenomanian flora of Lebanon (which included pteridophytes, gymnosperms, and angiosperms) was similar to the contemporary fossil floras known from North America, Central Europe, and Crimea, and indicates a climate similar to that of the current day Mediterranean region. Hjoula is known for its well-preserved fish fossils, but other organisms have been found there. One other pterosaur is known from the locality, the azhdarchoid Microtuban. Fish include the shark Cretalamna, the ray Libanopristis, the pachycormiform Eubiodectes, the polymixiiform Aipichthys, and the pycnodontid Nursallia. Insects include the dragonflies Libanoliupanshania and Libanocordulia, the lacewing Lebanosmylus, a scarabaeoid beetle, and a cicadellid. Crustaceans include the achelatan Charbelicaris, the palinuran Palibacus, the penaeid shrimp Libanocaris and Carpopenaeus, and the lobster Notahomarus. Octopuses include Keuppia and Styletoctopus. Many of the fossil taxa found in Hjoula are also found in the Hakel locality of the same age.

== See also ==
- Timeline of pterosaur research
- Paleontology in Lebanon
