= Paleobiology Database =

Online resource for paleobiology

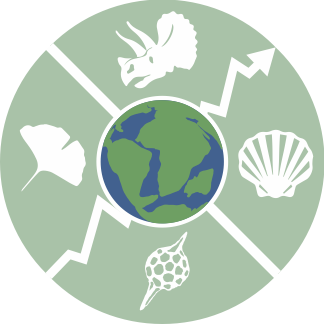
Paleobiology Database: Revealing the History of Life

The Paleobiology Database (PBDB) is an online resource for information on the distribution and classification of fossil animals, plants, and microorganisms.

== History ==
The Paleobiology Database originated in the NCEAS-funded Phanerozoic Marine Paleofaunal Database initiative, which operated from August 1998 through August 2000. From 2000 to 2015, PBDB received funding from the National Science Foundation. PBDB also received support form the Australian Research Council. From 2000 to 2010 it was housed at the National Center for Ecological Analysis and Synthesis, a cross-disciplinary research center within the University of California, Santa Barbara. It is currently housed at University of Wisconsin-Madison and overseen by an international committee of major data contributors.

The Paleobiology Database works closely with the Neotoma Paleoecology Database, which has a similar intellectual history, but has focused on the Quaternary (with an emphasis on the late Pleistocene and Holocene) at timescales of decades to millennia. Together, Neotoma and the Paleobiology Database have helped launch the EarthLife Consortium, a non-profit umbrella organization to support the easy and free sharing of paleoecological and paleobiological data.

== Researchers ==
Partial list of contributing researchers:

- Martin Aberhan, Museum für Naturkunde
- John Alroy, Macquarie University
- Chris Beard, Carnegie Museum of Natural History
- Kay Behrensmeyer, Smithsonian Institution
- David Bottjer, University of Southern California
- Richard Butler, Bayerische Staatssammlung für Paläontologie und Geologie
- Matt Carrano, Smithsonian Institution
- Fabrizio Cecca, Pierre-and-Marie-Curie University
- Matthew Clapham, University of California, Santa Cruz
- Bill DiMichele, Smithsonian Institution
- Michael Foote, University of Chicago
- Austin Hendy, Smithsonian Tropical Research Institute
- Steve Holland, University of Georgia
- Wolfgang Kiessling, Museum für Naturkunde
- Charles R. Marshall, University of California, Berkeley
- Alistair McGowan, University of Glasgow
- Arnie Miller, University of Cincinnati
- Johannes Müller, Museum für Naturkunde
- Mark Patzkowsky, Penn State
- Hermann Pfefferkorn, University of Pennsylvania
- Ashwini Srivastava, Birbal Sahni Institute of Palaeobotany
- Alan Turner, Liverpool John Moores University
- Mark D. Uhen, George Mason University
- Loïc Vilier, Université de Provence
- Pete Wagner, Smithsonian Institution
- Xiaoming Wang, Natural History Museum of Los Angeles County
- Robin Whatley, Smithsonian Institution
- Scott Wing, Smithsonian Institution

== Criticism ==
Donald Prothero has asserted that for several Cenozoic mammal families, range data in the PBDB are exaggerated due to uncritical inclusion of mistaken data.
