= Picea critchfieldii =

Scientific classification
- Kingdom: Plantae
- Clade: Tracheophytes
- Clade: Gymnospermae
- Division: Pinophyta
- Class: Pinopsida
- Order: Pinales
- Family: Pinaceae
- Genus: Picea
- Species: †P. critchfieldii

Binomial name
- †Picea critchfieldii Jackson & Weng

Extinct species of conifer

Picea critchfieldii is an extinct species of spruce tree formerly present on the landscape of North America, where it was once widely distributed throughout the southeastern United States. Plant macrofossil evidence reveals that this tree became extinct during the Late Quaternary period of Earth's history. At present, this is the only documented plant extinction from this geologic era. Hypotheses as to what specifically drove the extinction remain unresolved, but rapid and widespread climatic changes coincided with Picea critchfieldii's decline and ultimate extinction.

== History and classification ==
Picea critchfieldii was first described by Stephen T. Jackson and Chengyu Weng in a 1999 paper titled, "Late Quaternary Extinction of a Tree Species in Eastern North America" published in the journal Proceedings of the National Academy of Sciences of the United States of America. They coined the specific epithet critchfieldii as a patronym honoring botanist William B. Critchfield. The plant was named to honor Critchfield and his longstanding "advocacy of understanding the role of Quaternary history in shaping genetic structure of conifer populations."

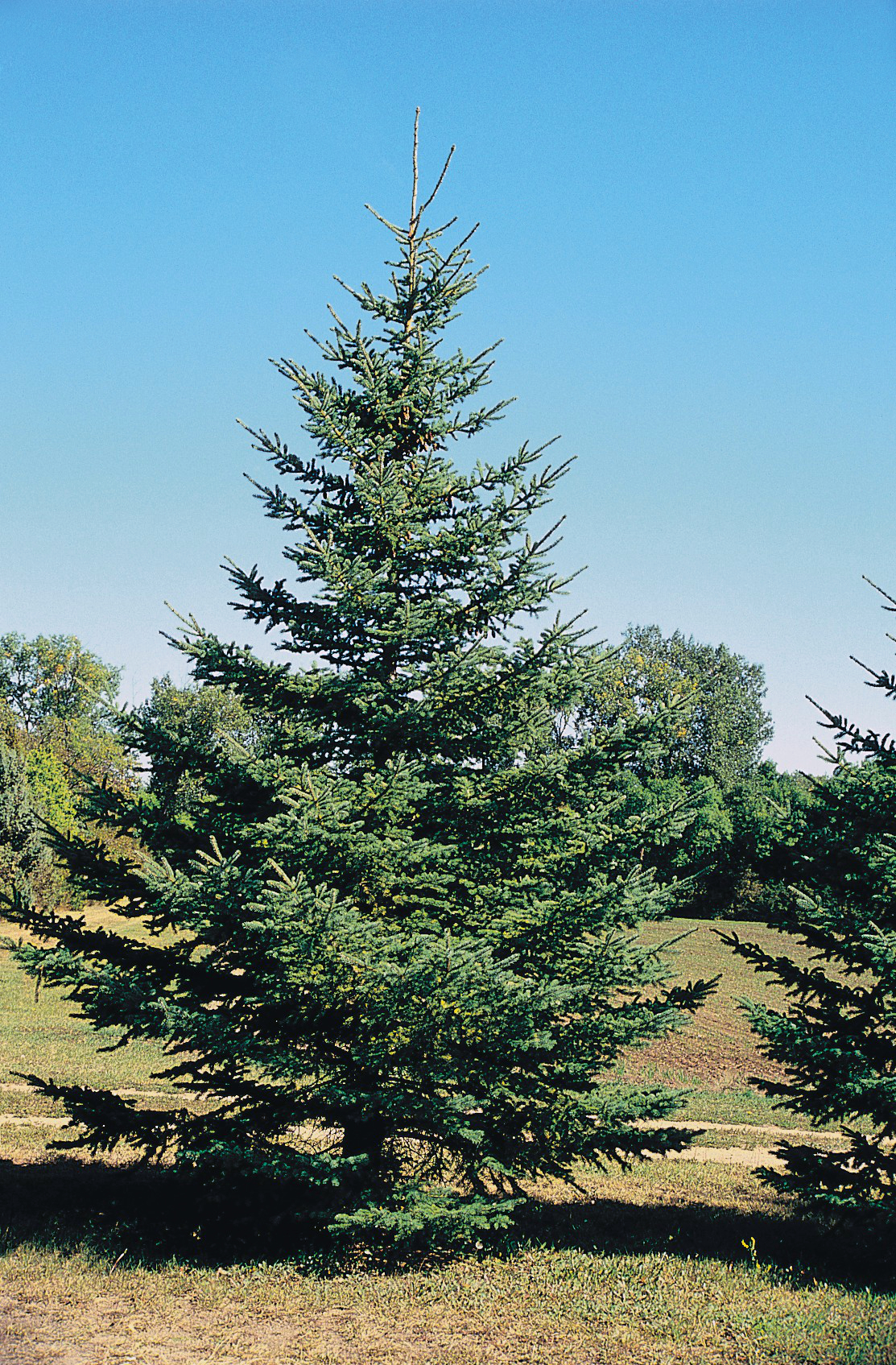
Extant Picea glauca, to which P. critchfieldii were formerly attributed

== Description ==
To describe Picea critchfieldii as a new and distinct species, carefully analyzed plant macrofossil specimens of fossilized spruce needles and cones were assessed. After close examination, these specimens could not be assigned to any extant species of Picea given distinctive morphological and anatomical features of their needles and cones. Fossil evidence thus supports the former existence of a distinct species of spruce: Picea critchfieldii.

Plant macrofossils are fossilized deposits that represent the multicellular sporophyte stage in the plant life cycle. Given significant variability among the sporophyte stage for different plant species, macrofossil specimens can exist as seeds, fruits, ovulate cones, needles, leaves, buds, and a host of other forms. The size of macrofossils and the depositional material in which they are preserved can similarly vary. The sporophyte phase of plants is morphologically distinct between different species, which permits species-level identification of macrofossil specimens and thus provides information about past vegetation with "high taxonomic resolution". To glean species-level data, macrofossil specimens must be carefully studied for distinct morphological and anatonomical features that permit their definitive assignment to a particular species, whether extant or extinct. The specificity and distinctiveness of macrofossil deposits of cones, seeds, and needles were paramount to the identification of the not-previously-known spruce Picea critchfieldii.

=== Cones ===
Picea critchfieldii had cylindrical ovulate cones with “scales narrowly fan-shaped with rounded margins” that were somewhat irregular. The dimensions of a cone in its entirety varied between approximately 60–100 mm in length and 14–20 mm in diameter. The dimensions of the rounded, fan-shaped cone scales varied between 18–21 mm in length and 11-13.5 mm in width.

=== Seeds ===
Picea critchfieldii had ovate, winged seeds. The seeds varied in size from about 3.5-4.5 mm in length and 2.6-2.8 mm in width with wings spanning about 8–11 mm in length.

=== Needles ===
The needles of Picea critchfieldii were between 7–9 mm in length and 0.6-1.0 mm in diameter. These needles had a cross-section that was quadrangular, an acute apex, and two resin ducts.

=== Pollen ===
Fossil pollen data was also important to the description and documentation of Picea critchfieldii. Fossil pollen evidence reveals that Picea was once dominant in the region surrounding the macrofossil collection sites now known to represent the extinct Picea critchfieldii. Given Picea critchfieldii's presence, it is thought that the Picea pollen found to dominate in locations that coincide with fossil collection sites is likely attributable to the extinct spruce and thus reveals that Picea critchfieldii was once widespread in the region. Evidence from morphometric analyses of pollen collected from the Picea critchfieldii fossil site known as Tunica Hills reveals that pollen collected here is morphologically distinct from, and thus not attributable to, that of the extant Picea glauca, Picea mariana, and Picea rubens. Given the distinctiveness of fossil pollen grains collected from this site of known former Picea critchfieldii presence, scientists suggest that "the morphologically distinctive Tunica Hills Picea pollen was probably produced by the extinct spruce species Picea critchfieldii." It remains difficult to conclude this definitively because Picea critchfieldii pollen has yet to be collected specifically within fossilized reproductive structures of the plant to confirm association; scientists nonetheless hypothesize that the pollen is most likely that of Picea critchfieldii given its distinctiveness from pollen of other extant taxa.

Fossil pollen data, used in the field of palynology, represents fossilized deposits of plant pollen grains reflecting the gametophyte stage in the plant life cycle and ranges in size from 5-150 micrometers. Fossil pollen data is used to infer past vegetation, but pollen grains, unlike macrofossils, are often unable to be distinguished beyond the genera level given morphological similarities among pollen grains of distinct species within the same genus. In some cases, pollen grains are morphologically indistinct even among different genera within the same plant family. As a result, fossil pollen often results in "taxonomic smoothing" that inhibits fine-scale resolution of past vegetation to the species level. However, examples of Picea pollen being identified as morphologically distinct, species-level units exist. Pollen from Picea glauca, Picea rubens, and Picea mariana has been characterized, classified, and assessed with relative accuracy based on distinct morphological attributes of each species. Similarly, close analysis of hypothesized Picea critchfieldii pollen demonstrates a species-level analysis of spruce pollen granules.

Pollen data remains one of the primary mechanisms by which paleoecologists glean insight into past vegetation to catalog the historical presence of taxa on the landscape. Picea pollen identifiable to the species level is particularly useful. In the case of Picea critchfieldii, the careful analysis of plant macrofossils was paramount to the description of the species and the documentation of its extinction. The interpretation of morphologically distinct pollen, in conjunction with this fossil evidence, has helped further characterize its former presence and distribution on the landscape.

== Distribution, habitat, and environmental context ==
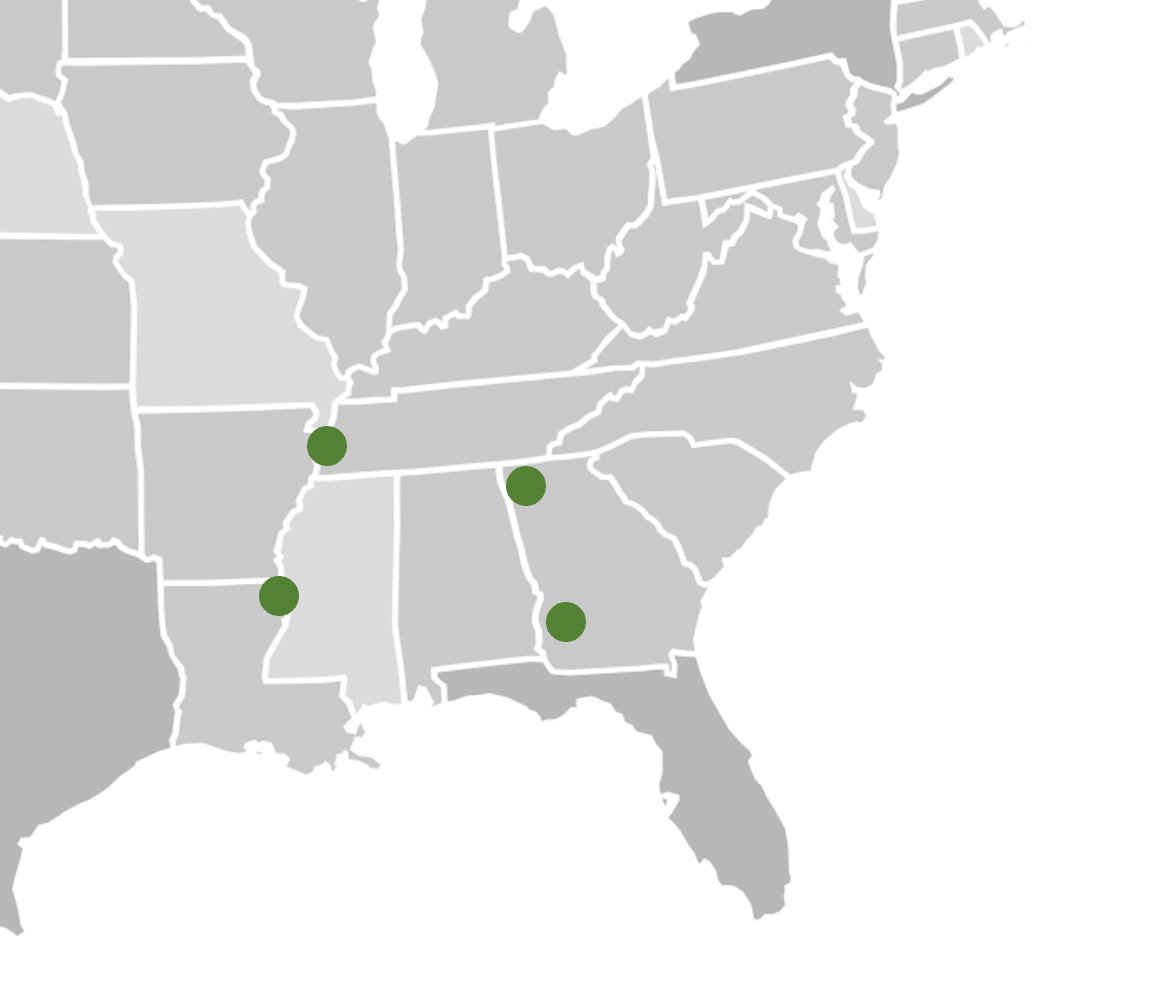
Map of approximate fossil collection site locations of Picea critchfieldii specimens, based on Figure 1 of Jackson and Weng, 1999.

=== Geographic distribution ===
Many of the fossils documenting Picea critchfieldii have been collected from the Tunica Hills region in Louisiana and Mississippi, which maps to 31°N, 91°29'W. The fossil specimens that aided in the discovery and description of P. critchfieldii mostly originate from stream cut exposures composed of fluvial silt and clay soils from the Late Quaternary. Other documented collection sites occur in western Tennessee, southwestern Georgia, and northwestern Georgia. The geographic range of P. critchfieldii spanned the southeastern United States, where it was once widespread. The species has been recorded from several sites dating to the Last Glacial Maximum in the Lower Mississippi Valley and in Georgia. Considering all fossil collection sites together, paleoecologists suspect the former range of P. critchfieldii spanned over 240,000 km (150,000 mi) in the region.

=== Ecology ===
==== Co-occurring species ====
At the Tunica Hills sites where many fossil specimens of Picea critchfieldii have been discovered, collections of Quercus, Juglans nigra, Acer, Carpinus caroliniana, Fagus grandifolia, Carya, Ulmus americana, and Juniperus virginiana have also been made at these same sites. These species are all temperate hardwood taxa. Fossil pollen data from the Tunica Hills region dates to between 24,670 and 17,530 years ago and suggests that Picea was the dominant species in the regional uplands surrounding this area, where smaller populations of Quercus and other hardwood species also occurred. The former species assemblages revealed by macrofossil and pollen collections have no-analog to present plant communities in eastern North America.

In other collection sites where Picea critchfieldii has been found, it is documented as co-occurring with various species of Pinus and with Picea glauca. These are cool-temperate conifer taxa.

==== Environmental and habitat tolerances ====
The species with which Picea critchfieldii has been found to co-occur reveal information about its presumed environmental and habitat tolerances. The fossil collections that demonstrate an association between Picea critchfieldii and temperate hardwood tree species suggests Picea critchfieldii could tolerate warmer climate conditions than other, extant Picea species. Though thought to have an affinity for warmer conditions than other Picea species given past assemblages, other fossil collection sites where the plant has been found to occur with cool-temperate conifers suggests some degree of overlap in the environmental tolerances of Picea critchfieldii and extant members of the genus.

Eastern North American spruce species that remain extant have boreal and montane affinities and are entirely confined to cool climates. However, the affinities of extinct Picea critchfieldii likely differ from those of extant spruce given the environmental tolerances of the species with which it has been found to co-occur. Picea critchfieldii is presumed to have had warmer but still overlapping temperature tolerances as compared to extant Picea.

=== Late Quaternary context ===
The Late Quaternary is a time in geologic history, within the broader Quaternary Period, that encompasses approximately the last 25,000 years of Earth's history. During this time, continuous climate change has occurred across varying timescales with different degrees of magnitude.

The Late Quaternary is well-represented in the geologic record at globally-distributed sites. Sites representative of the Late Quaternary that contain records of flora, fauna, and climates past can be dated with high degrees of accuracy through a variety of methods that allow observational inferences to be made at timescales between 10 and 10,000 years.

As is true for Picea critchfieldii, pollen and macrofossil specimens from a variety of species present during the Late Quaternary have been collected and studied across the globe. Such specimens are tied to specific locations that can be assigned accurate historical dates, which can then be linked to past climate data that has been independently gleaned from other sources such as ice cores or tree rings. Pairing records of past biota with climate data allows paleoecologists to reconstruct past vegetational landscapes. Given the rich spatial and temporal data embedded in the geologic record of the Late Quaternary, changes in the vegetational composition and structure of the landscape can be studied with great detail.

Picea critchfieldii existed on the landscape of North America during and directly preceding the Last Glacial Maximum of the Late Quaternary. Picea critchfieldii is currently the only plant extinction documented from the Late Quaternary period.

== Extinction ==
=== Timing of extinction ===
The extinction of Picea critchfieldii is dated to approximately 15,000 years ago and represents the only documented tree species extinction of the Late Quaternary. This extinction dates to approximately the time when the Earth was transitioning out of the Last Glacial Maximum and into the Holocene period of the Quaternary.

=== Environmental change ===
During the transition between the Last Glacial Maximum and the Holocene, the Earth was experiencing exceptional warming. During this deglaciation, the climate underwent rapid and abrupt changes. The discovery of Picea critchfieldii's extinction at the time of this rapid and continuous climate change suggests that such changes may have contributed to its demise.

=== Hypothesized causes of extinction ===
The definitive root cause of the extinction of Picea critchfieldii remains largely unresolved and is not currently tied to a specific, historical event or cause. There is no known linkage between human exploitation and the extinction of Picea critchfieldii, which differs from the presumed cause of contemporaneous mammal extinctions. Given dramatic climatic changes occurring during the Late Quaternary at the time the plant extinction was recorded, it is postulated that the extinction is at least broadly linked to changing climatic regimes.

Within the context of broader climatic changes, hypothesized factors potentially contributing to the decline and extinction of Picea critchfieldii include a pathogen, an inhibited dispersal ability, or a complete loss of suitable habitat.

=== Contemporaneous extinctions ===
Not only is Picea critchfieldii the only plant extinction documented during the Late Quaternary, but it is one of very few plant extinctions known from the entire Quaternary Period.

In contrast to this one known plant extinction during the Late Quaternary, significant numbers of mammalian extinctions took place during the same period in what is known as the Quaternary Extinction Event. These extinctions are largely attributed to a complementary role of human exploitation and rapid environmental change during the last deglaciation. A myriad of hypotheses have been proposed to explain these mammalian extinctions, but the current scientific consensus ascribes a role for both climate and human impacts as driving large numbers of mammalian genera and species to extinction during the Late Quaternary.

Though it remains possible that Picea critchfieldii is the only species to go extinct during the Late Quaternary, scientists suggest that “taxonomic smoothing” within collected pollen data and insufficient collections of plant macrofossils could be camouflaging other potential plant extinctions. Further discovery and examination of plant macrofossils is needed to determine whether other plant extinctions have occurred in addition to the loss of Picea critchfieldii.

== Biodiversity implications ==
=== Species' responses to change in the late Quaternary ===
The Late Quaternary was a time of continuous climatic changes of varying rates and magnitudes. As Late Quaternary climates changed, plant species responded as individuals in a variety of ways, including toleration, migration, habitat shift, extinction, and altered population densities.

Paleoecological evidence supports a tendency for plant species to historically pursue the ‘migration’ route. The fossil record and the general lack of documented plant extinctions suggests that plant species have migrated far distances across continents in response to past environmental changes. Data from the fossil record also provides evidence that plant species have been able to respond to changing conditions by altering their population densities, transitioning between phases of rarity and abundance while nonetheless persisting on the landscape.

Despite paleoecological support for migration, toleration, and population density changes as past responses to environmental change, the discovery of Picea critchfieldii reveals that extinction is another possible response.

=== Relation to modern climate change ===
With the discovery of Picea critchfieldii and its presumed linkage to climatic changes during the Last Glacial Maximum, ecologists conjecture that consideration of this species “is potentially sobering in view of the likelihood of future climate changes, which could be of similar or greater rapidity, abruptness, and magnitude as those of the last glacial/interglacial”.

Patterns of vegetational change are commonly used to infer future scenarios. Fossil records from the Late Quaternary, when the magnitude and rate of climate change mirrored that which is predicted for the future, are often used to inform how biota of the present might respond to ongoing global changes. However, scientists suggest that “history is better suited to providing cautionary tales rather than specific images of future climate and vegetation change.” The demise and discovery of Picea critchfieldii is one such cautionary tale.
