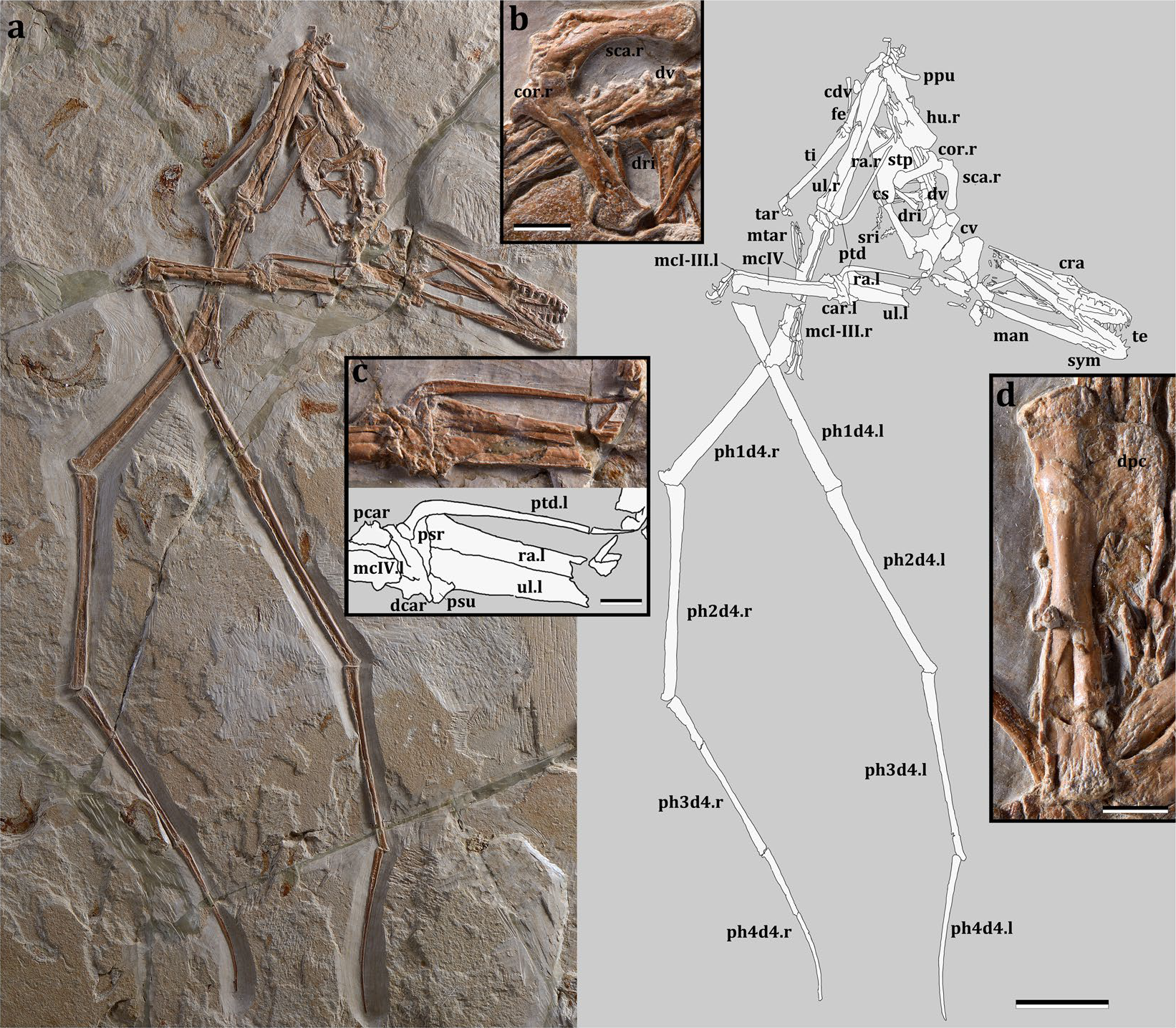
- Holotype fossil of Mimodactylus libanensis

Scientific classification
- Kingdom: Animalia
- Phylum: Chordata
- Class: Reptilia
- Order: †Pterosauria
- Suborder: †Pterodactyloidea
- Clade: †Lanceodontia
- Clade: †Istiodactyliformes
- Clade: †Mimodactylidae; Kellner et al., 2019

Genera
- †Haopterus; †Linlongopterus?; †Mimodactylus

= Mimodactylidae =

Mimodactylids Temporal range: Early-Late Cretaceous, 125–95 Ma

Family of istiodactyliform pterosaurs

Mimodactylidae is a group or family of pterosaurs known from Cretaceous deposits in East Asia and the Middle East. They are phylogenetically more closely related to the Istiodactylidae than to the Ornithocheiridae or the Anhangueridae, forming the clade Istiodactyliformes together with the Istiodactylidae and Hongshanopterus.

In 2019, Alexander Wilhelm Armin Kellner, Michael Wayne Caldwell, Borja Holgado, Fabio Marco Dalla Vecchia, Roy Nohra, Juliana Manso Sayão and Philip John Currie defined the clade Mimodactylidae as the group consisting of Mimodactylus libanensis and all species more closely related to Mimodactylus than to Istiodactylus latidens, Ikrandraco avatar or Anhanguera blittersdorffi. The same year, just two species were known: Mimodactylus from the Cenomanian of Lebanon and its sister taxon Haopterus from the Aptian of China.

== Classification ==
The cladogram below is from the topology recovered by Kellner et al. (2019).

- Istiodactyliformes
  - - Mimodactylidae
      - Haopterus
      - Mimodactylus
  - - Hongshanopterus
    - Istiodactylidae
      - Nurhachius
      - Istiodactylinae
        - Liaoxipterus
        - - Istiodactylus sinensis
          - Istiodactylus latidens
