= Charles R. Marshall =

Australian paleobiologist

Charles Marshall
- Born: Canberra, Australia
- Education: B.Sc. Australian National University; PhD University of Chicago
- Awards: Charles Schuchert Award (1999); Guggenheim Fellowship (1997); NSF National Young Investigator Award (1992); University Medal (1984); Tillyard Prize (1984)
- Scientific career
- Fields: Paleontology; Paleobiology
- Workplaces: University of California, Los Angeles (1991–1999); Harvard University (1999–2009); University of California, Berkeley (2010–)

Charles Richard Marshall is an Australian paleobiologist and the director of the University of California Museum of Paleontology, where he is also a professor in the department of Integrative Biology at the University of California, Berkeley.

== Career ==
Marshall graduated with honours in Palaeontology, Mathematics, and Zoology from the Australian National University in 1984 (B.Sc., 1st Class Honours), and received his Ph.D. in Evolutionary Biology from the University of Chicago in 1989, with paleobiologist David M. Raup and cell biologist Hewson Swift as his advisors. He then did an NIH (NRSA) postdoc with evolutionary developmental biologist Rudy Raff at Indiana University from 1989 to 1991. He taught at UCLA from 1991 to 1999, except for the period of his Guggenheim Fellowship spent at the Smithsonian Institution, at Harvard from 1999 to 2009, where he was also a curator at the Museum of Comparative Zoology, and at UC Berkeley since 2010, for which period he has also been director of the UCMP, replacing interim director Roy L. Caldwell. He has been on the Board of Reviewing Editors for Science since 2009.

== Research ==
Marshall's first prominent work was on using confidence intervals to better estimate the full stratigraphic range of a lineage. This work led him to propose with Peter Ward that the fossil record of the Mollusca suggested that the extinction at the Cretaceous-Paleogene boundary may have been due in part to marine regression. It also led to revised estimates of the origination times and fidelity of the fossil record for various lineages, including primates and orchids (with the description of Meliorchis). In 1993, he found empirical evidence for exceptions to Dollo's law of irreversibility with Elizabeth and Rudolf Raff. His studies on diversity through time included being a Principal Investigator on the grant that led to the creation of the Paleobiology Database with John Alroy. He has also worked on major transitions in the history of life, including the Cambrian explosion.
