= University of California Museum of Paleontology =

Coordinates: 37°52′16.18″N 122°15′43.24″W

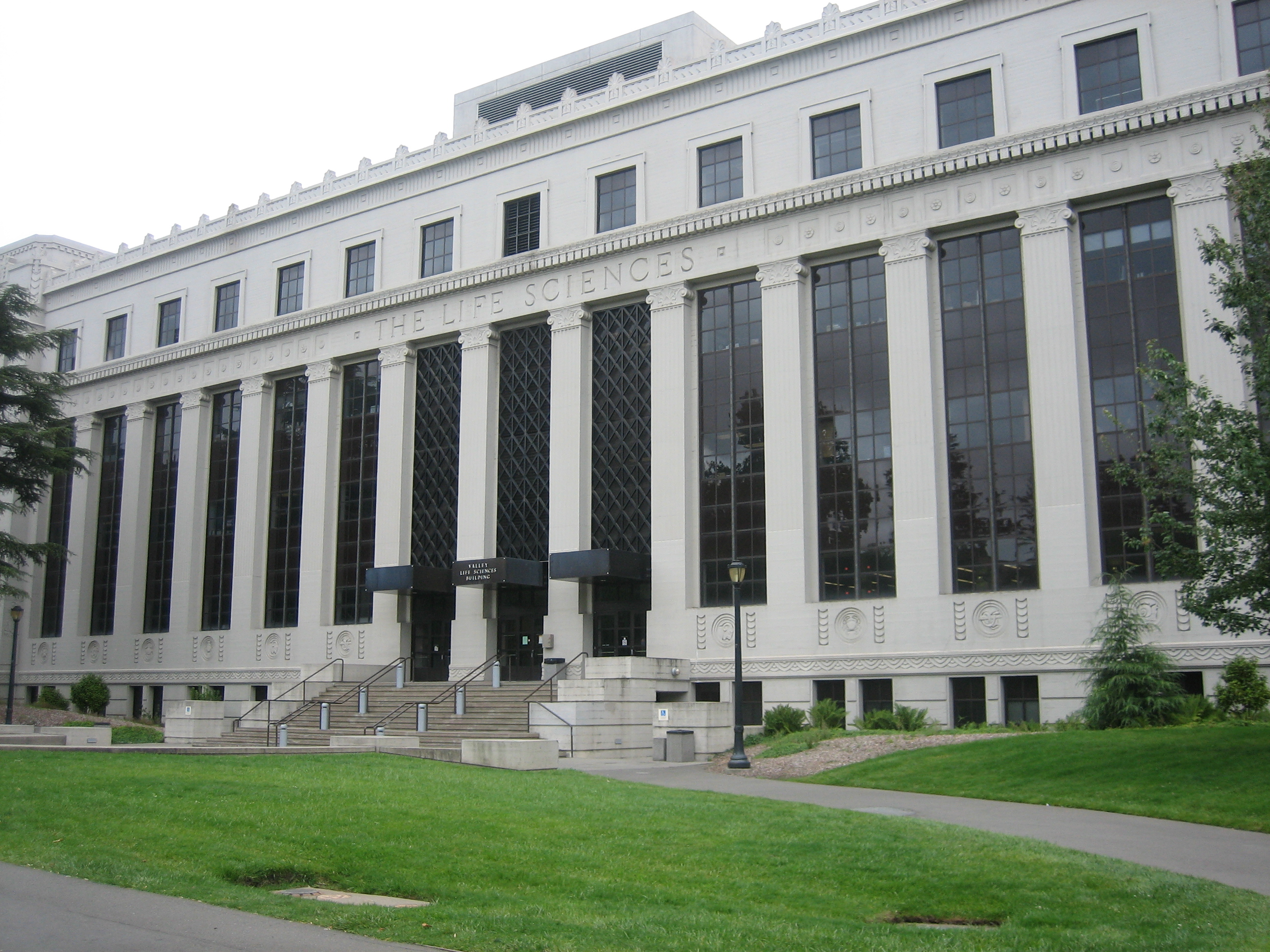
- The University of California Museum of Paleontology is located within the Valley Life Sciences Building
- Established: 1921
- Location: Berkeley, California
- Type: Natural history museum
- Director: Charles R. Marshall
- Website: ucmp.berkeley.edu

The University of California Museum of Paleontology (UCMP) is a paleontology museum located on the campus of the University of California, Berkeley.

The museum is within the Valley Life Sciences Building (VLSB), designed by George W. Kelham and completed in 1930. Its collections are primarily intended for research and are, thus, not accessible to the public. A limited number of fossils from the collection is on display in the VLSB. Although located on the Berkeley campus, the museum is the primary locality for storing fossils collected statewide. The original fossils, around which the current collection has grown, were those gathered as part of the California Geological Survey from 1860 to 1867.

== Website ==
UCMP was one of the first museums to have its own website in the early 1990s, due to its location within a technology-oriented university with a good Internet connection. The site has been applauded for its use of visually appealing graphics, was nominated for a Webby Award five times, and received a medal from the Smithsonian Institution. It also had a cameo appearance in the movie Deep Impact, albeit under an incorrect name.

== Notable figures ==
Annie Montague Alexander was the first benefactor of the museum, and led some early expeditions.

=== Faculty ===
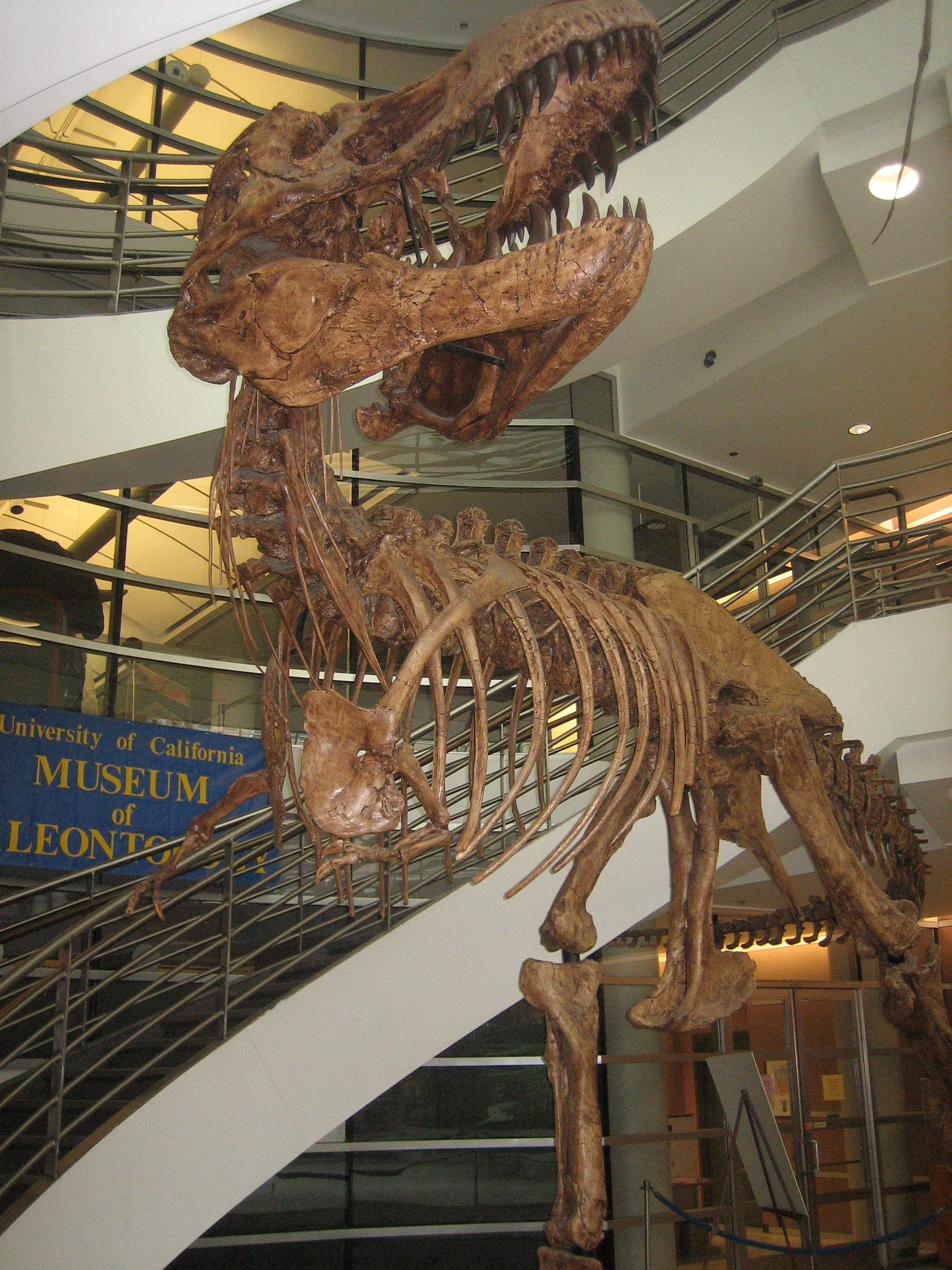
A Tyrannosaurus skeleton located on the first floor of the VLSB

Many notable paleontologists have worked as staff at UCMP. Dates given after each name indicate when the person was part of the university faculty or working in the museum.

- John C. Merriam (1869–1945)
- Charles Lewis Camp (1921-1975)
- William Diller Matthew (1927–1930)
- Ruben Arthur Stirton (1930–1966)
- Samuel Paul Welles (1940–1997)

=== Directors ===
1. Bruce L. Clark (1880-1945)
2. William Diller Matthew (1871-1930)
3. Charles Lewis Camp (1893-1975)
4. Ruben Arthur Stirton (1901-1966)
5. Donald E. Savage (1917-1999)
6. Joseph T. Gregory (1914-2007)
7. William B. N. Berry
8. William A. Clemens Jr.
9. Jere H. Lipps
10. David R. Lindberg
11. Roy L. Caldwell
12. Charles R. Marshall

== See also ==
- Paleontology in California
- Museum of Vertebrate Zoology
