= No-analog (ecology) =

In paleoecology and ecological forecasting, a no-analog community or climate is one that is compositionally different from a (typically modern) baseline for measurement. Alternative naming conventions to describe no-analog communities and climates may include novel, emerging, mosaic, disharmonious and intermingled.

Modern climates, communities and ecosystems are often studied in an attempt to understand no-analogs that have happened in the past and those that may occur in the future. This use of a modern analog to study the past draws on the concept of uniformitarianism. Along with the use of these modern analogs, actualistic studies and taphonomy are additional tools that are used in understanding no-analogs. Statistical tools are also used to identify no-analogs and their baselines, often through the use of dissimilarity analyses or analog matching Study of no-analog fossil remains are often carefully evaluated as to rule out mixing of fossils in an assemblage due to erosion, animal activity or other processes.

== No-analog climates ==
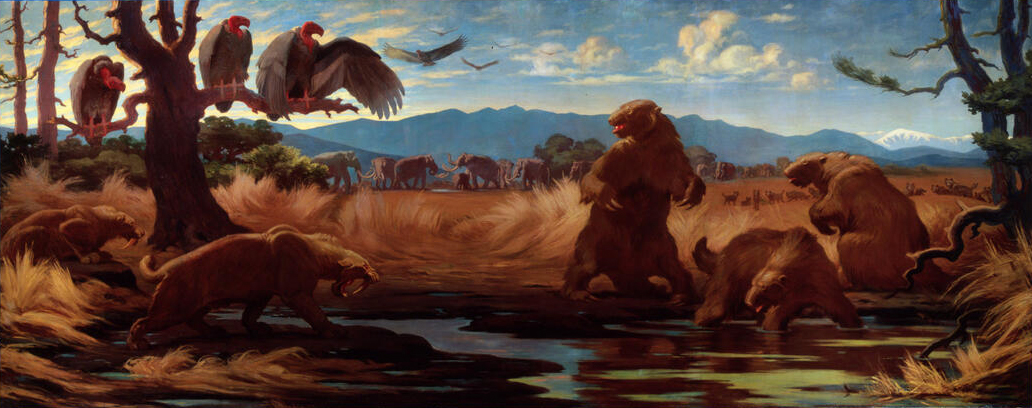
"The late Pleistocene mammalian fauna of North America [pictured above] has no analog in the corresponding Holocene fauna."

Conditions that are considered no-analog climates are those that have no modern analog, such as the climate during the last glaciation. Glacial climates varied from current climates in seasonality and temperature, having an overall more steady climate without as many extreme temperatures as today's climate.

Climates with no modern analog may be used to infer species range shifts, biodiversity changes, ecosystem arrangements and help in understanding species fundamental niche space. Past climates are often studied to understand how changes in a species' fundamental niche may lead to the formation of no analog communities. Seasonality and temperatures that are outside the climates at present provide opportunity for no-analog communities to arise, as is seen in the late Holocene plant communities. Evidence of deglacial temperature controls having significant effects on the formation of no-analog communities in the midwestern United States provides example of how intertwined climate and species assemblage are when studying no-analogs.

== No-analog communities ==
No-analog communities are defined by the existence of extant species in groupings that are not currently seen in modern biomes, or populations that have history of species assemblages that are no longer seen in the modern world. Formation of no-analog communities can be due to multiple factors, including climate conditions, environmental changes, human action, disease or species interactions. Migrations of species causes displacement and colonization into areas that may have been outside of what was known to be their fundamental niche, such as northern species moving south and mountain fauna being removed entirely or isolated to the peaks.

=== Quaternary no-analogs ===
Quaternary fossil records from the Pleistocene present a developed history of no-analogs. Records of plants, mammals, coleopterans, mollusks and foraminifera with no modern analogs are abundant in the fossil record. In the last glacial maximum, species aggregations were different from previous time periods due to a unique set of climate conditions. The development of no-analog plant and mammal communities is often interconnected, and also tied to occurrence of no-analog climates. Changes in plant community compositions may also lead to no-analog conditions with addition of biotic pressures such as competition and disease, or enhanced fire regimes.

The North American pollen record provides examples of detailed no-analog plant assemblages from the late quaternary. Pollen assemblages that contain no modern analog are present from many late glacial and early Holocene records, and extend from 14,000 to 12,000 years ago. Pollen is a commonly used proxy in studying plant no-analogs. These assemblages are marked by high abundances of taxa such as Betula, the co-occurrence of now allopatric species such as Fraxinus and Picea, and the low abundance of taxa that are now modernly abundant, such as Pinus. These associations are evident across Alaska, eastern North America, Europe and the southwestern US.

The environmental conditions during the Pleistocene offered a climate that was more productive for plant species than climate conditions that exist today. This is evident through extensive records of high abundances of broadleaved trees Ulmus, Ostrya, Fraxinus and Quercus mixed with boreal conifers such as Picea and Larix during the late Holocene. New evidence states that deglacial temperatures are now hypothesized to be a major contributor to the formation of no-analog plant communities in the Midwestern US. Christensen bog fauna during this time period also represent a significant example of no-analog assemblages from the Pleistocene. It is also possible that these plant assemblages formed due to influence from megafaunal extinctions during the late quaternary, and there is also evidence that shows connection between novel plant assemblages and new fire regimes.

=== Mammal no-analogs ===
Pleistocene mammal assemblages had high levels of diversity and abundance of megafauna. During the late quaternary extinction there was a loss of many megafauna. This extinction has led to the creation of a no-analog for modern ecosystems, which are lacking high diversity or abundance of large herbivores.

These no-analog mammal assemblages and the loss of megafauna coincides with no-analog plant community rise. The shifts in these groups has been hypothesized to have direct relationship to one another, with the possibility of a release from herbivory pressures causing the bloom in novel plant assemblages during the late quaternary.

== Future no-analog climates ==
Modern ecologists looking to study future climates and ecosystem assemblages use modern analogs to understand how species distributions will change and how to infer management of ecosystems with climate change. Along with modern analogs, studying past climates and how they've changed is being used to understand future novel climates due to climate changes. Species distribution models are currently being tested with no-analog climates to get more predictive estimates of species range shifts and biodiversity loss.

Examples of modern conditions that are considered no-analogs are also present. Accelerated tree growth due to environmental conditions and pollutants that are present today provide no analog to past conditions of tree growth.

=== Emerging ecosystems ===
The concept of emerging ecosystems originated from the discussion of the ecological and economical fate of agricultural land once it is no longer in use. Similarly to the definition of a no-analog, emerging ecosystems are considered as those that have species composition and abundances that are not seen in modern analogs. Emerging ecosystems not only encompass the understanding of ecological consequences, but also those social, economic and cultural associations. These ecosystems may provide opportunities for species to colonize new niche space.

=== Additional examples ===
Projections of future no-analog communities based on two climate models and two species-distribution-model algorithms indicate that by 2070 over half of California could be occupied by novel assemblages of bird species, implying the potential for dramatic community reshuffling and altered patterns of species interactions

== See also ==
- Axel Heiberg Island ~80°N is known for its large ~45-million-year-old 'fossil forests'.
- Biogeography
- Ecology
- Effects of global warming
- Ellesmere Island ~80°N is known for its ~55-million-year-old 'fossil forest'.
- Extinction risk from global warming
- La Brea Tar Pits are well known for their fossils of extinct North American megafauna.
- Paleoclimatology
- Paleontology
- Pleistocene rewilding
