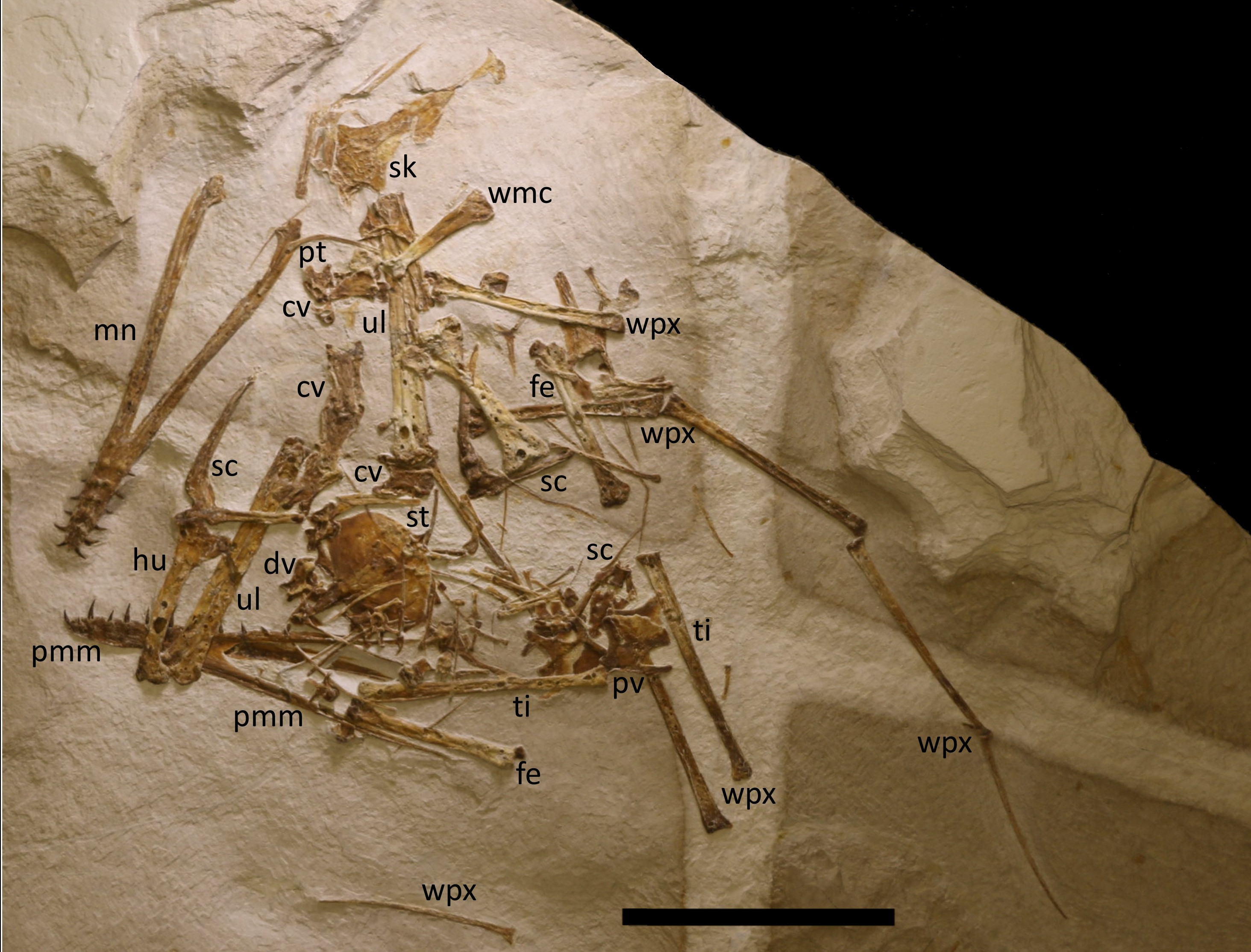
- Holotype specimen

Scientific classification
- Kingdom: Animalia
- Phylum: Chordata
- Class: Reptilia
- Order: †Pterosauria
- Clade: †Pterodactyliformes
- Genus: †Laueropterus; Hone, 2026
- Species: †L. vitriolus

Binomial name
- †Laueropterus vitriolus Hone, 2026

= Laueropterus =

Laueropterus Temporal range: Late Jurassic, Tithonian

Genus of monofenestratan pterosaur

Laueropterus (lit. 'Lauer's wing') is an extinct genus of monofenestratan pterosaur known from the Late Jurassic (Tithonian age) Mörnsheim Formation of Germany. The genus contains a single species, Laueropterus vitriolus, known from a partial skeleton and skull discovered in 2007 and scientifically named in 2026. With a wingspan of about 1 metre (3.3 ft), it was larger than most other early monofenestratans. It coexisted with Makrodactylus, Skiphosoura, and "Rhamphodactylus", all of which are likely close relatives.

== Discovery and naming ==
Schaudiberg Quarry near Mühlheim, Germany

The Laueropterus fossil material was discovered around 2007 in the Schaudiberg Quarry, representing outcrops of the Mörnsheim Formation near the town of Mühlheim in Bavaria, Germany. The specimen, which is preserved on a thick limestone slab, was sold to the collector Wolfgang Krauss, who sold it to Günther Hoppe in Switzerland, under whom it was prepared. It was then sold to Martin Görlich before being obtained by the Lauer Foundation in Illinois, United States, in January 2024, where it is now permanently accessioned as specimen LF 6268. The specimen consists of much of the skeleton, including the skull and mandible. It is two-dimensionally compressed, and no longer in anatomical articulation.

In 2026, David Hone described Laueropterus vitriolus as a new genus and species of monofenestratan pterosaur based on these fossil remains, establishing LF 6268 as the holotype specimen. The generic name, Laueropterus, honors René and Bruce Lauer and their contributions to making Solnhofen fossils scientifically accessible. Their surname is combined with the Ancient Greek word pterus, meaning 'wing'. The specific name, vitriolus, is derived from the Latin word vitriolum, which refers to sulphuric acid, alluding to the pitted texture observed on the holotype, as if these parts had been dissolved away.

== Description ==
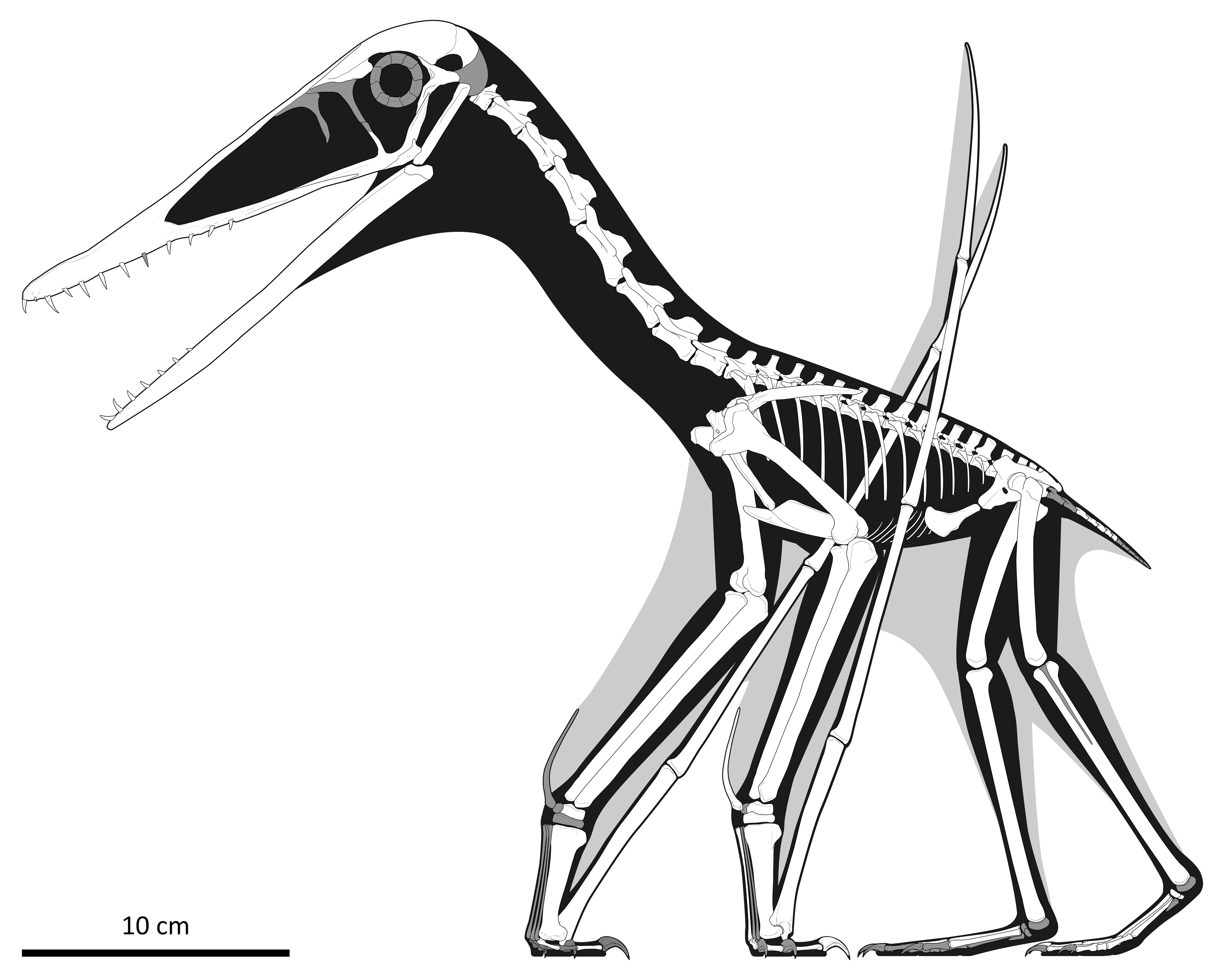
Reconstructed skeleton

The L. vitriolus holotype was likely nearing skeletal maturity when it died, based on the fusion of several skeletal elements and the animal's general large size. It has an estimated wingspan of around 1 metre (3.3 ft). This is smaller than the coeval Skiphosoura, which has a wingspan of about 1.75 m (5.7 ft), but larger than most of its other relatives. The skull of LF 6268 is around 20.5 cm (8.1 in) long. Laueropterus shares several anatomical features with Skiphosoura, such as the shape and spacing of the teeth, the strong curvature of the pteroid bone, and the robusticity of the mandible and femur, but can be distinguished from this taxon due to its proportionally longer and shallower snout, less conspicuous crest on the premaxilla, and various other proportional and morphological differences.

== Classification ==
Although Hone (2026) did not include a phylogenetic analysis in his description of Laueropterus, he concluded it could be assigned to the pterosaur clade Monofenestrata based on the proportionally large skull with a single nasoantorbital fenestra, in addition to its relatively long cervical (neck) vertebrae. The metacarpal and first phalanx of the wing are proportionally short, both indicative of a position outside of the more exclusive clade Pterodactyloidea.

Laueropterus is the fourth member of the non-pterodactyloid monofenestratan grade found in the Mörnsheim Formation, following Makrodactylus in 2025, Skiphosoura, named in 2024, and the informally-named "Rhamphodactylus". Propterodactylus, named in 2024, is yet another member of this grade from the Solnhofen Limestone, although it derives from the underlying Painten Formation.

== See also ==
- Monofenestrata
- Paleobiota of the Solnhofen Limestone
- 2026 in archosaur paleontology
