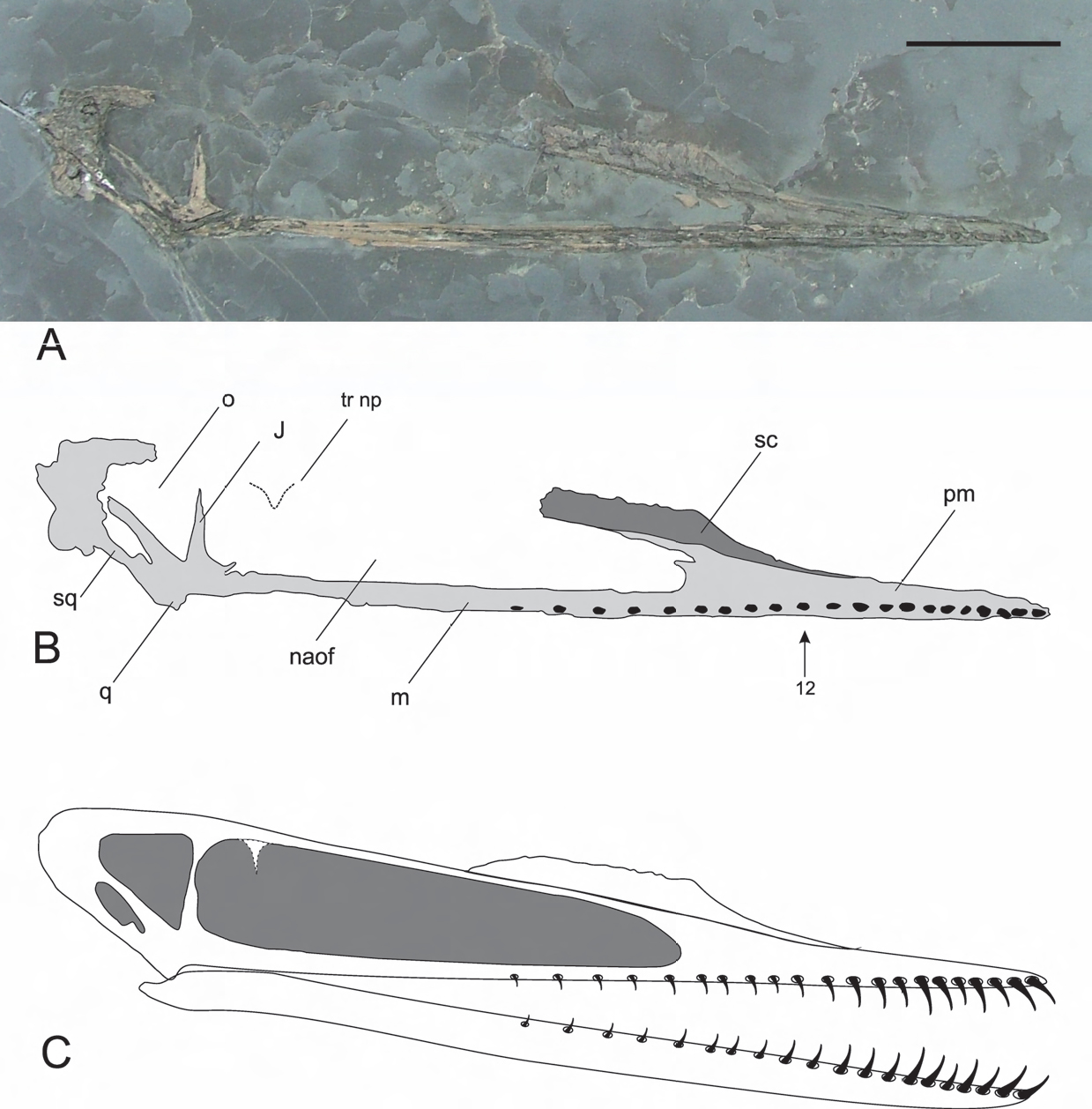
- Photograph (A), line drawing (B), and reconstruction (C) of the right side of the holotype skull

Scientific classification
- Kingdom: Animalia
- Phylum: Chordata
- Class: Reptilia
- Order: †Pterosauria
- Family: †Wukongopteridae
- Subfamily: †Wukongopterinae
- Genus: †Cuspicephalus; Martill & Etches, 2013
- Species: †C. scarfi

Binomial name
- †Cuspicephalus scarfi Martill & Etches, 2013

= Cuspicephalus =

Cuspicephalus Temporal range: Late Jurassic, 155.7–153 Ma

Genus of wukongopterid pterosaur from the Late Jurassic

Cuspicephalus is an extinct genus of monofenestratan pterosaur known from Dorset in England. Its fossil remains date back to the Late Jurassic period.

== Discovery and naming ==
Diagram of known remains

In December of 2009, fossil collector Steve Etches discovered the partial skull of a pterosaur in Kimmeridge Bay on the Isle of Purbeck peninsula of Dorset, England. Part of the Jurassic Coast World Heritage Site, the rocks of this area are the heart of the Kimmeridge Clay, a Late Jurassic fossil-bearing deposit. As pterosaur remains are rare in the UK, the skull was considered an important discovery. It was collected in the Museum of Jurassic Marine Life as specimen number MJML 1918, and was later put on display there.

Most of the skull is preserved; the majority of the rostrum (anatomy) along with tooth sockets, part of a crest along the top of the skull, nasal bones, the bottom edge of the nasantorbital fenestra (a large hole occupying the center of the skull), and much of the back of the skull are all preserved. Other portions of the skull were eroded away, with faint traces of some missing elements; no teeth were preserved. Although only the right side of the skull was initially prepared, further work on the specimen later exposed the left side of the skull, which better preserved the same elements as the right side.

The specimen was described in a 2013 study by David Martill and Etches, published in Acta Palaeontologica Polonica. Based upon the specimen, they established the new genus and species Cuspicephalus scarfi. The generic name is derived from cuspis, Latin for "point", after its pointed rostrum, and a Latinised Greek κεφαλή, kephalè, for "head". The specific name honours artist and cartoonist Gerald Scarfe, whose caricatures usually feature pointed noses reminiscent of Cuspicephalus. In particular, a Scarfe caricature of former British Prime Minister Margaret Thatcher as a "torydactyl", evoking the appearance of a pterodactyl, served as inspiration for the choice of name. A further study on the genus, along with French pterosaur Normannognathus, was published by Martill, Etches, and Mark Witton in 2015. They aimed to clarify the relationship of Cuspicephalus to other pterosaurs, something that had remained unclear during the original study. The left side of the skull was not exposed until after both studies had been published.

== Description ==
Estimated size compared to a human

As a wukongopterid pterosaur, Cuspicephalus would have been a relatively small flying animal with a large head, longer than its torso, and an elongated tail. Based on the size of the known skull, 32.6 centimetres (12.8 in) long, it is estimated to have a wingspan of around 1.2 metres (3.9 ft) or 1.75 metres (5.7 ft), large for a Jurassic pterosaur and significantly larger than its immediate relatives in Wukongopteridae.

It is most readily distinguished from other pterosaurs by the elongate shape of its skull. It is triangular, extremely slender, and has a long pointed rostrum. The complete skull is almost five and a half times longer than tall, the most extreme ratio seen in any pterosaur. Related pterosaurs such as Darwinopterus and Kunpengopterus also have elongate skulls, as do early pterodactyloids such as Germanodactylus, but none so extremely as seen in Cuspicephalus. It also has a higher tooth count than its immediate relatives, twelve or thirteen pairs present in front of the nasantorbital fenestra (a large hole occupying much of the skull, characteristic of monofenestratans). These teeth are mostly all the same shape and size, with sockets under the nasantorbital fenestra being smaller. They are tightly packed at the front of the snout, with less space between teeth than related species. Each socket is preserved facing to the side, but it is unclear to what extent this is the result of the extremely flattened preservation of the specimen. At the front of the snout, the first pair of tooth sockets are oriented somewhat forward, and the first two teeth likely would have protruded beyond the front of the jaw. This condition is rare in pterosaurs, but shared with Darwinopterus. Around thirty pairs of teeth are thought to have been present overall, and the tooth bearing section of the jaw is entirely straight. The top of the rostrum is very slightly concave, similar to other wukongopterids but unlike Germanodactylus.

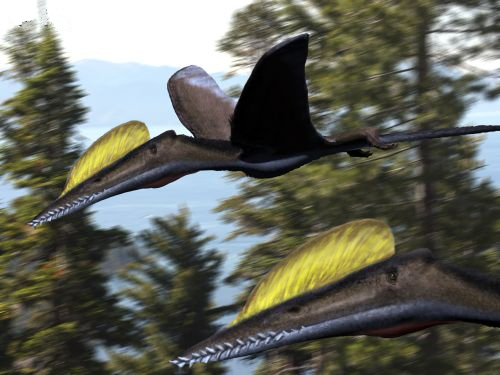
Speculative life restoration

As with many pterosaurs, a crest is present atop the skull. It begins after the twelve tooth, around a third of the skull's length from the jaw tip, and rises gradually before reaching a height of 1 centimetre (0.39 in) and leveling off to a flat shape broadly parallel with the roof of the skull. While its exact extent is unknown due to much of the skull roof being unpreserved, the lack of any sign of it on the preserved back of the skull seems to indicate it didn't extend to the back of the orbit (the hole containing the eye), unlike the crest of Darwinopterus but similar to that of Germanodactylus. In general, the gentle rise of the crest is similar to the related Pterorhynchus, and also reminiscent of Germanodactylus. Underneath the crest, the nasantorbital fenestra is large, nearly half the length of the skull; this extreme size is a key trait identifying it as a wukongopterid, and is unlike the condition seen in most pterodactyloids.

The orbit has a somewhat trapezoid shape. Its front edge is straight and vertical, oriented at a right angle with the straight and horizontal top edge. Contrastingly, the back edge is only vertical at its top, before sharply turning into an angle that meets with the bottom of the front edge. This shape is similar to Germanodactylus and to other wukongopterids. The jugal (a bone along the bottom of the orbit with three processes; a maxillary process forming part of the nasantorbital fenestra's bottom rim and two processes forming the back and front of the orbit) has a unique anatomy, with the maxillary process being relatively short. In other wukongopterids such as Darwinopterus and Kunpengopterus this process is twice or even four times the length of the other two, but all three are of a similar length in Cuspicephalus and the process compromises only one sixth of the bottom rim of the fenestra, the rest formed by a process on the maxilla. This unusual condition is shared with Germanodactylus. The angle between the jawline and the back of the skull is 140°, similar to other wukongopterids and Germanodactylus but unlike most pterodactyloids, which possess larger cranial angles.

== Classification ==
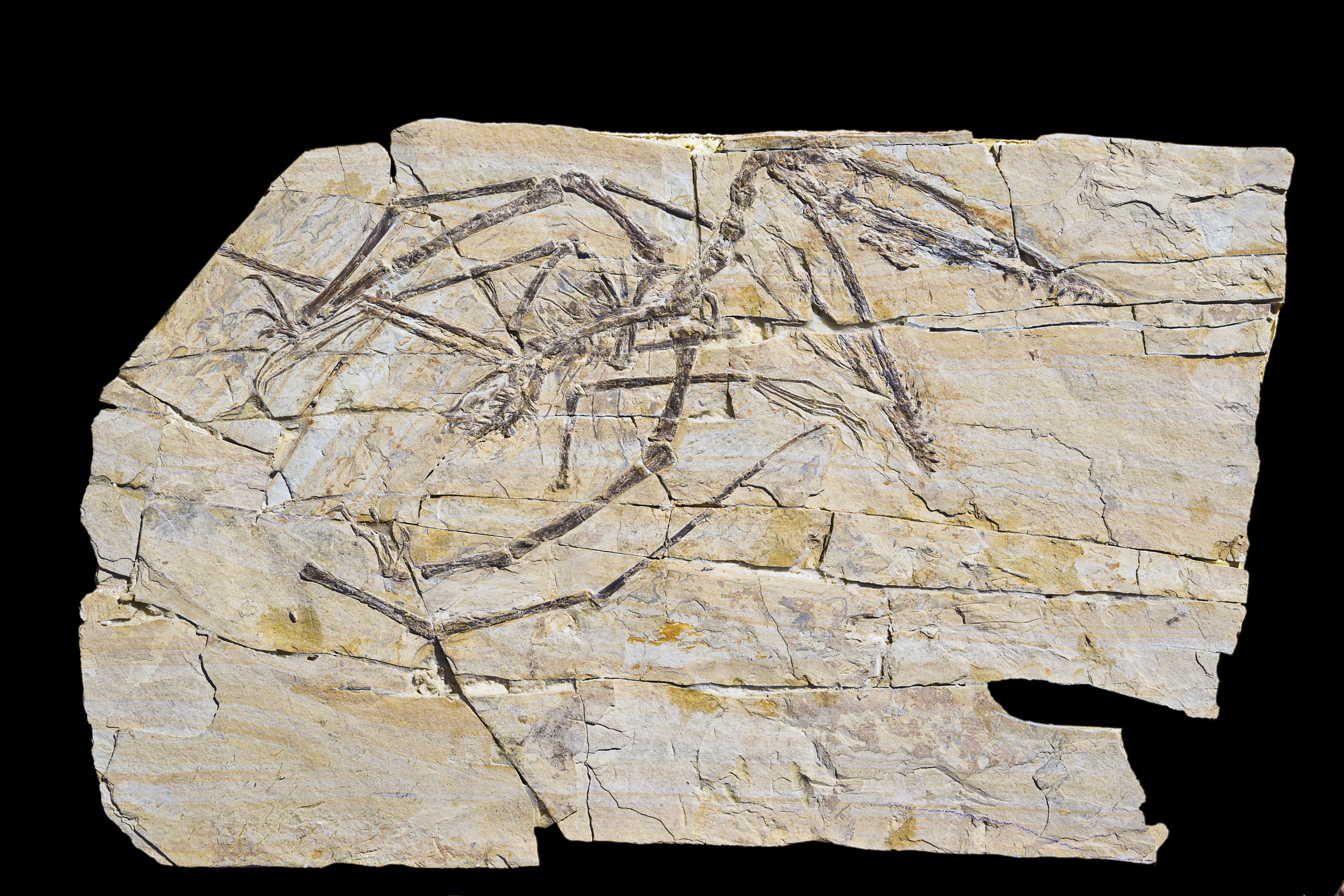
Darwinopterus modularis is often considered the closest relative of Cuspicephalus

Cuspicephalus is thought to belong to Wukongopteridae in the clade Darwinoptera, a group of pterosaurs displaying intermediate anatomy between rhamphorhynchoids and later pterodactyloids. Upon initial naming, its exact phylogenetic position was unclear. It was clearly identifiable as a member of Monofenestrata, the grouping of pterodactyloids and their relatives united by the fusion of the nasal and antorbital fenestrae into a singular large nasantorbital fenestra. But it appeared to display a mixture of traits seen in different members of this group. Overall skull morphology of Cuspicephalus displayed similarities to both wukongopterids and germanodactylids. The presence of a high number of uniformly sized teeth all the way to the front of the snout, as well as the morphology of the back of the skull, seemed to suggest a relationship to Darwinopterus and other wukongopterids. Contrastingly, the short maxillary process of the jugal was uniquely shared with Germanodactylus.

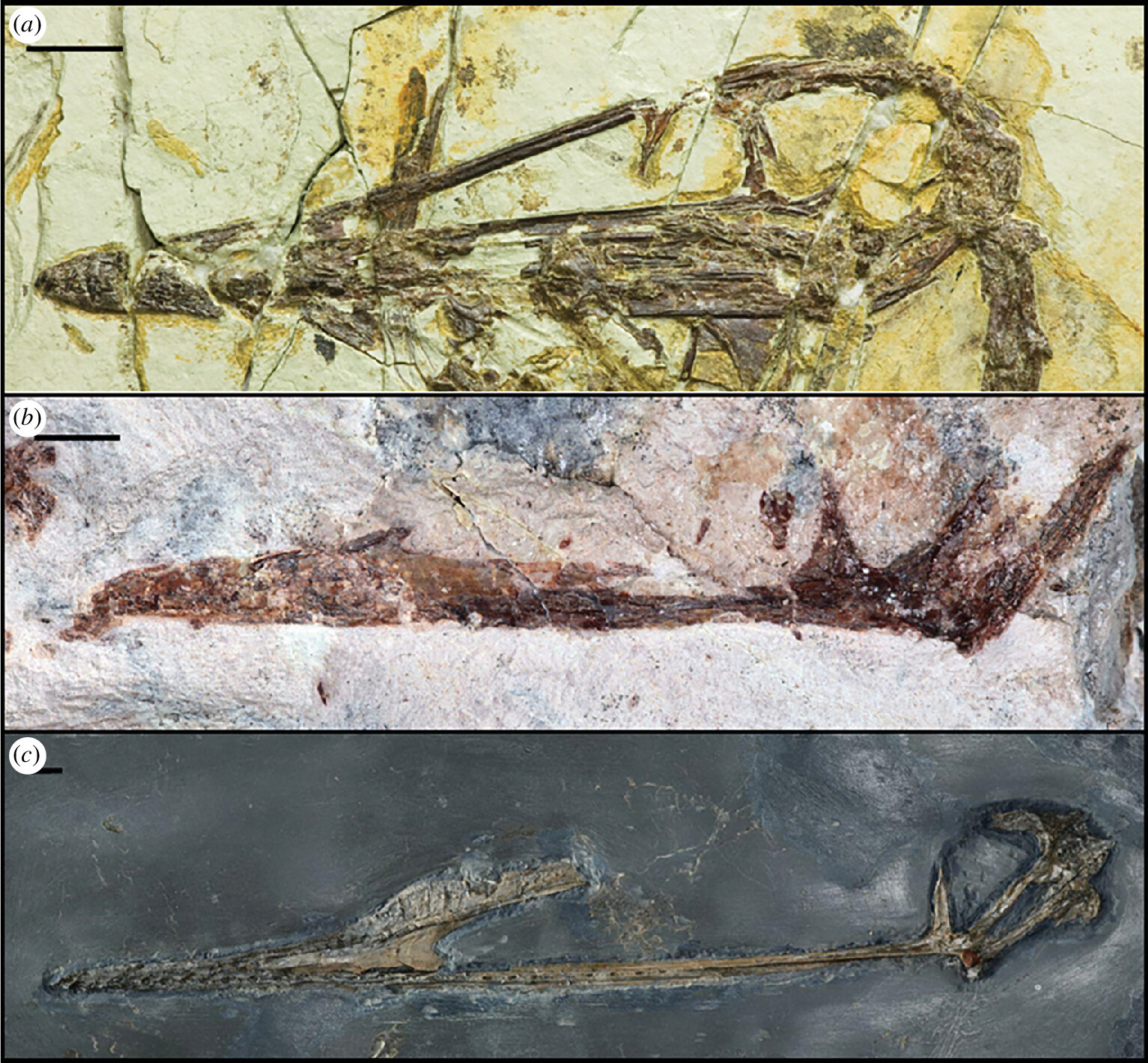
Comparison of the later-prepared left side of the Cuspicephalus skull (bottom), compared to the skulls of Darwinopterus linglongensis (top) and Melkamter (center)

To resolve this confusion, a follow-up study was conducted in 2015 focusing on its classification. Difficulty was noted in assigning incomplete remains to Wukongopteridae, as the group was primarily distinguished by proportions of the complete skeleton. To resolve the, a comprehensive assessment of differences between the skulls of wukongopterids and pterodactyloids was conducted. Resultant was a combination of 16 features that distinguish wukongopterid skulls and could be used for identification. Cuspicephalus was found to display nearly every feature; of twelve that could be assessed in the known specimen, eleven matched wukongopterid traits. Key identifying features included a low crest with a striated texture emerging shortly before the nasal opening, a piriform orbit, small and uniformly sized teeth, and a toothrow ending under the front half of the nasantorbital fenestra. Most notable was the length of the nasantorbital fenestra, over half of the length of the skull, a key trait of wukongopterids absent in any other Jurassic pterosaurs. Only a single feature was found to be slightly inconsistent with previously known wukongopterids, the spacing of the front teeth, but this was considered expected due to the larger size of Cuspicephalus than other wukongopterids. Further comparison with Germanodactylus highlighted differences from Cuspicephalus. The straight top of the skull and expanded exoccipital processes at the back of the skull differ from Cuspicephalus, and its teeth are more gracile and were larger near the front of the snout. The long maxillary process tying Cuspicephalus to Germanodactylus was noted to similarly be present in some wukongopterids, casting doubt on the importance of this similarity. Considering all of the above data, Cuspicephalus was concluded to be a member of Wukongopteridae, the first discovered outside of China.

Phylogenetic analyses in later studies would corroborate the placement of Cuspicephalus within Wukongopteridae and Darwinoptera. A 2021 study found it to be deeply nested within Wukongopteridae, and established the subgroup Wukongopterinae to include Wukongopterus, Darwinopterus, and Cuspicephalus to the exclusion of Kunpengopterus. The group was united by the piriform shape of the orbit and the convex shape of the posteroventral edge of the nasantorbital fenestra, in addition to traits of the limbs. Within Wukongopterinae, Cuspicephalus was found to be the closest relative of Darwinopterus. Contrastingly, one 2023 study found Cuspicephalus to be a germanodactylid. Some studies also dispute, the conception of Darwinoptera as a natural grouping, instead considering them a succession of taxa variously more closely related to Pterodactyloidea. A 2024 paper supporting this idea found Cuspicephalus to be related to Darwinopterus modularis in a basal position within Monofenestrata, with other taxa traditionally considered wukongopterids such as Wukongopterus, Kunpengopterus, Changchengopterus, and other species of Darwinopterus all more closely related to pterodactyloids. Nonetheless, other studies continue to argue that anatomical similarities between darwinopterans support their nature as close relatives. A 2024 study naming Ceoptera found Darwinoptera to be a diverse natural grouping of pterosaurs including Cuspicephalus, Chinese wukongopterids, and the genera Allkaruen and Kryptodrakon, not previously recovered within the group.

A cladogram of the results of the 2021 phylogenetic analysis by Xuanyu Zhou and colleagues is shown below:

- Monofenestrata
  - - Changchengopterus pani
    - Pterodactyloidea
  - Darwinoptera
    - Pterorhynchus wellnhoferi
    - Wukongopteridae
      - - Kunpengopterus sinensis
        - Kunpengopterus antipollicatus
      - Wukongopterinae
        - Wukongopterus lii
        - - Cuspicephalus scarfii
          - Darwinopterus modularis

The recognition of a wukongopterid pterosaur from the Kimmeridgian age of the United Kingdom was considered the significant, as it expanded the range of the group geographically and in geologic time. Previously known wukongopterids form the Tiaojishan Formation of China were five million years older, with Cuspicephalus being the first known from another part of the world. Furthermore, its large size expanded the known anatomical diversity of a group previously only known from animals so similar their distinctiveness had been called into doubt by some studies. Later studies would further expand the known range of Darwinoptera, with the young age of Cuspicephalus demonstrating the lineage was successful for at least 30 million years. It has been noted as part of a large trend of taxa such as Skiphosoura and "Rhamphodactylus" demonstrating a progression from smaller size in the Middle Jurassic to large size in the Late Jurassic, as pterosaurs as a whole expanded into a wider ecoscape. The radiation of pterosaurs within the Jurassic remains mysterious due to a lack of Middle Jurassic fossils, and Late Jurassic pterosaurs such as Cuspicephalus likely represent the aftermath of diversification that occurred in the Early Jurassic and Middle Jurassic rather than the result of Late Jurassic radiation as has been traditionally assumed.

== See also ==
- List of pterosaur genera
- Timeline of pterosaur research
