= Makrodactylus =

Makrodactylus Temporal range: Late Jurassic, early Tithonian

Scientific classification
- Kingdom: Animalia
- Phylum: Chordata
- Class: Reptilia
- Order: †Pterosauria
- Clade: †Pterodactylomorpha
- Clade: †Monofenestrata
- Genus: †Makrodactylus; Hone et al., 2025
- Species: †M. oligodontus

Binomial name
- †Makrodactylus oligodontus Hone et al., 2025

Genus of monofenestratan pterosaurs

Makrodactylus (meaning "long finger") is an extinct genus of monofenestratan pterosaurs known from the Late Jurassic Mörnsheim Formation of Germany. The genus contains a single species, Makrodactylus oligodontus, known from the partial skull and skeleton of a mature individual discovered in 2014 and scientifically named in 2025. It has an elongated skull with no more than seven tooth positions, restricted to the front part of the mouth. With a wingspan of 0.6 metres (2.0 ft), it was smaller than all other early monofenestratans. It coexisted with Skiphosoura and "Rhamphodactylus", both of which are likely close relatives.

== Discovery and naming ==
Makrodactylus type locality near Mühlheim, Germany

The Makrodactylus holotype specimen, LF 1370, was discovered by Roland Pöschl in April 2014 in outcrops of the Mörnsheim Formation, part of the Solnhofen Archipelago. This specific site, the Schaudiberg Quarry, is located near the town of Mühlheim in Bavaria, Germany. The specimen was then prepared over the following four months before its acquisition by the Lauer Foundation for Paleontology, Science and Education in September 2014. It is now permanently accessioned as part of the Lauer Foundation collection in Illinois, United States, as specimen LF 1370. It consists of a partially disarticulated incomplete skeleton—largely compressed into a single slab—including almost all of the cranium and mandible, several cervical (neck) and dorsal (back) vertebrae, part of the pectoral and pelvic girdles, and most of the fore- and hindlimbs.

In 2025, David Hone and colleagues described Makrodactylus oligodontus as a new genus and species of basal monofenestratan pterosaurs based on these fossil remains. The generic name, Makrodactylus, combines the Ancient Greek words makros, meaning "long" and daktylos, meaning "finger", referencing the distinctively elongated wing finger in the taxon. The specific name, oligodontus, combines the Ancient Greek words oligos, meaning "few", and odous, meaning "tooth", in reference to the characteristic low number of teeth in the upper and lower jaws.

== Description ==
The Makrodactylus holotype has a wingspan of 60.6 centimetres (23.9 in), making it moderately-sized in relation to the average adult Jurassic pterosaur, similar in size to some Solnhofen taxa. However, this is notably small compared to early members of the Monofenestra. The coeval Skiphosoura had a wingspan almost three times that of Makrodactylus, at 174.2 cm (5.72 ft). "Rhamphodactylus", another contemporary, was slightly smaller than Skiphosoura, with a 99.8 cm (39.3 in) wingspan. Wingspans of species assigned to the Chinese Darwinopterus (Tiaojishan Formation) are slightly larger than Makrodactylus, ranging from 65.4 cm (25.7 in) (D. linglongtaensis) to 88.4 cm (34.8 in) (D. robustodens). The holotype of Propterodactylus is smaller (54 cm (21 in) wingspan), but it belongs to a juvenile individual and would have grown much larger. Meanwhile, the Makrodactylus holotype belongs to an adult individual. This can be determined based on the extent of fusion between the skull bones (characteristic of mature specimens), as well as the absence of the fine-grained texture seen on the bones of young specimens. As such, Makrodactylus represents the smallest known member of the non-pterodactyloid monofenestratan grade known from a mature specimen.

The skull has a generally triangular outline, and is 10.9 cm (4.3 in) long. Similar to Propterodactylus but distinct from many close relatives and later-diverging taxa, the skull is somewhat short and tall. The orbit has a subcircular shape typical of these taxa. There are only seven teeth spanning the premaxilla–maxilla (upper tooth-bearing bones), a surprisingly low count. Furthermore, the toothrow ends anterior (before) the nasoantorbital fenestra (NAOF), whereas the teeth continue past the start of the NAOF in many other early monofenestratans. The mandible (lower jaw) has a long symphysis (fused region between the left and right sides). There are six teeth in the dentary (lower tooth-bearing bone), with teeth 1, 2, and six being notably smaller than the others. A seventh tooth may have been present, but this region is not preserved well enough to provide a positive identification. The end of the dentary toothrow approximately lines up with the posterior (toward the back) part of the mandibular symphysis. In general, all of the teeth have a thin, curved morphology, and are evenly spaced in the jaws. The upper jaw teeth were likely more vertically oriented than those in the mandible, which were angled slightly laterally (toward the sides).

== Classification ==
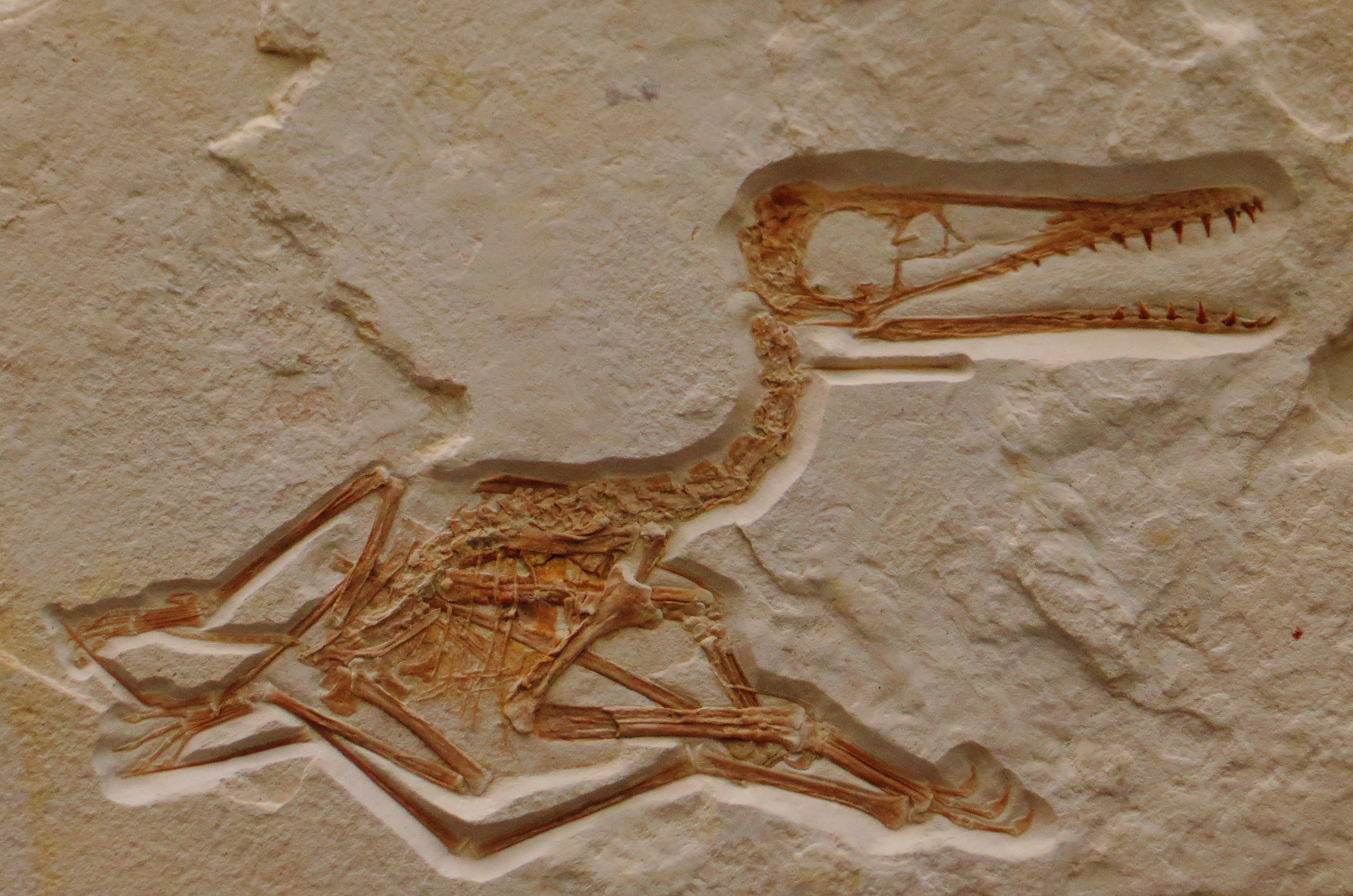
Holotype of the fellow non-pterodactyloid monofenestratan Propterodactylus

Although Hone and colleagues did not include a phylogenetic analysis in their description of Makrodactylus, they concluded it could be assigned to the pterosaur clade Monofenestrata based on the proportionally large skull with a single nasoantorbital fenestra. The metacarpal and first phalanx of the wing are proportionally short, both indicative of a basal position in the clade, outside of the Pterodactyloidea. The morphology of the front part of the jugal, the free metacarpals, the first wing phalanx, and the robust femur are reminiscent of Propterodactylus, a more derived non-pterodactyloid.

Makrodactylus is the third member of the non-pterodactyloid monofenestratan grade found in the Mörnsheim Formation, following Skiphosoura, named in 2024, and the informally-named "Rhamphodactylus". Propterodactylus, named in 2024, is the fourth member of this grade from the Solnhofen Limestone, although it derives from the underlying Painten Formation.

== See also ==
- Monofenestrata
- Paleobiota of the Solnhofen Limestone
- 2025 in archosaur paleontology
