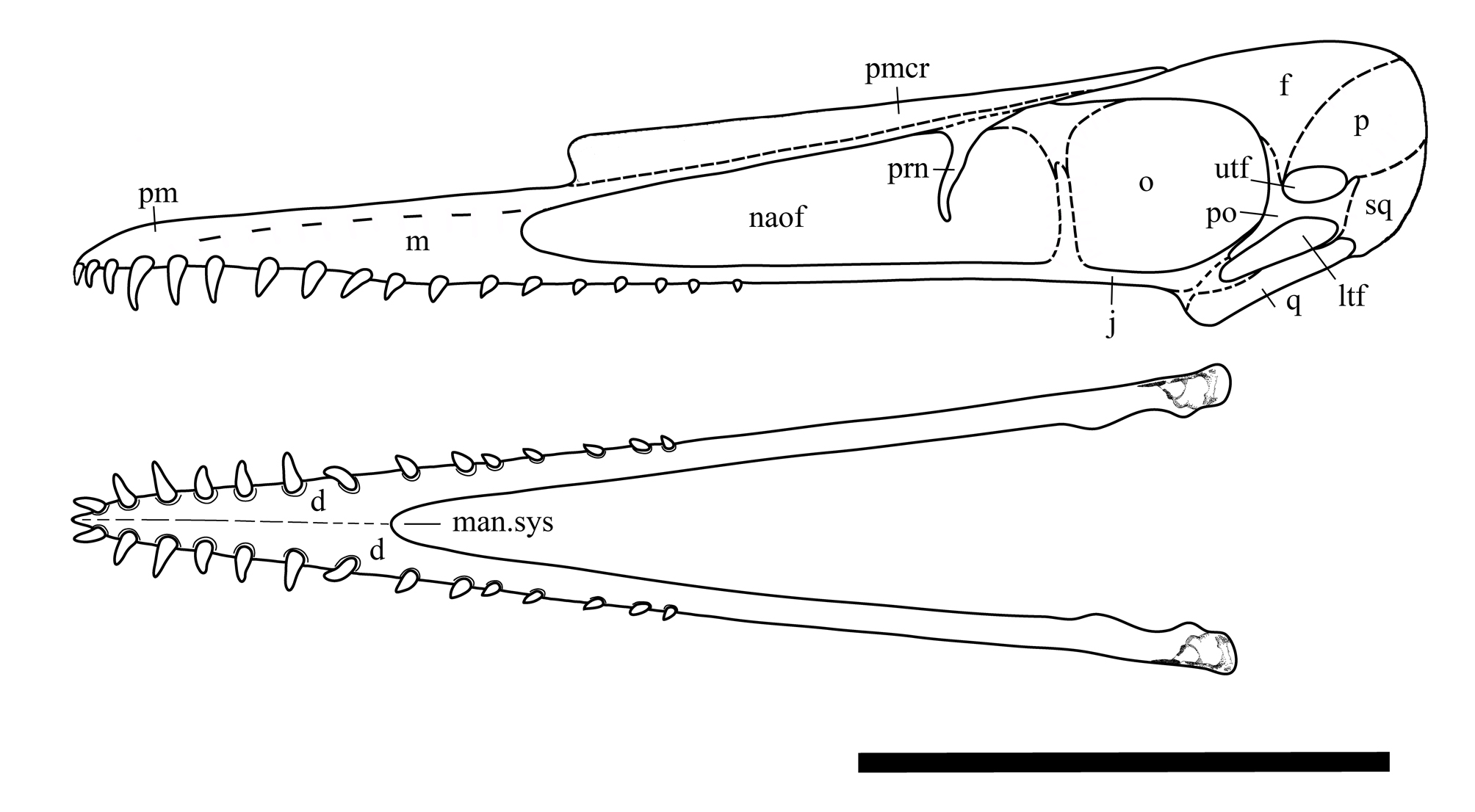
- Skull of Darwinopterus camposi, showing eponymous single fenestra

Scientific classification
- Kingdom: Animalia
- Phylum: Chordata
- Class: Reptilia
- Order: †Pterosauria
- Clade: †Pterodactylomorpha
- Clade: †Monofenestrata; Lü et al., 2010

Subgroups
- †Makrodactylus; †Melkamter; †Darwinoptera; †Allkaruen?; †Ceoptera; †Kryptodrakon?; †Pterorhynchus; †Wukongopteridae; †Pterodactyliformes; †Changchengopterus; †Douzhanopterus; †Laueropterus; †Propterodactylus?; †Skiphosoura; †Anurognathidae?; †Pterodactyloidea

= Monofenestrata =

Monofenestratans Temporal range: Early Jurassic – Late Cretaceous, 179–66 Ma

Clade of breviquartossan pterosaurs

Monofenestrata is a clade of pterosaurs. It includes the pterosaurs in which the nasal and antorbital fenestra (openings/holes) in the skull are merged into a single fenestra. The clade includes the pterodactyloids and their close relatives.

== Classification ==
The clade Monofenestrata was in 2010 defined as the group consisting of Pterodactylus and all species sharing with Pterodactylus the synapomorphy of an external nostril confluent with the antorbital fenestra, the major skull opening on the side of the snout. The name is derived from Greek monos, "single", and Latin fenestra, "window". The concept was inspired by the discovery of Darwinopterus, a species combining a pterodactyloid-type skull with a more basal build of the remainder of the body. The Darwinoptera, a primitive subgroup of monofenestratans showing this transitional anatomy, was also named for Darwinopterus and defined as all descendants of its common ancestor with Pterorhynchus.

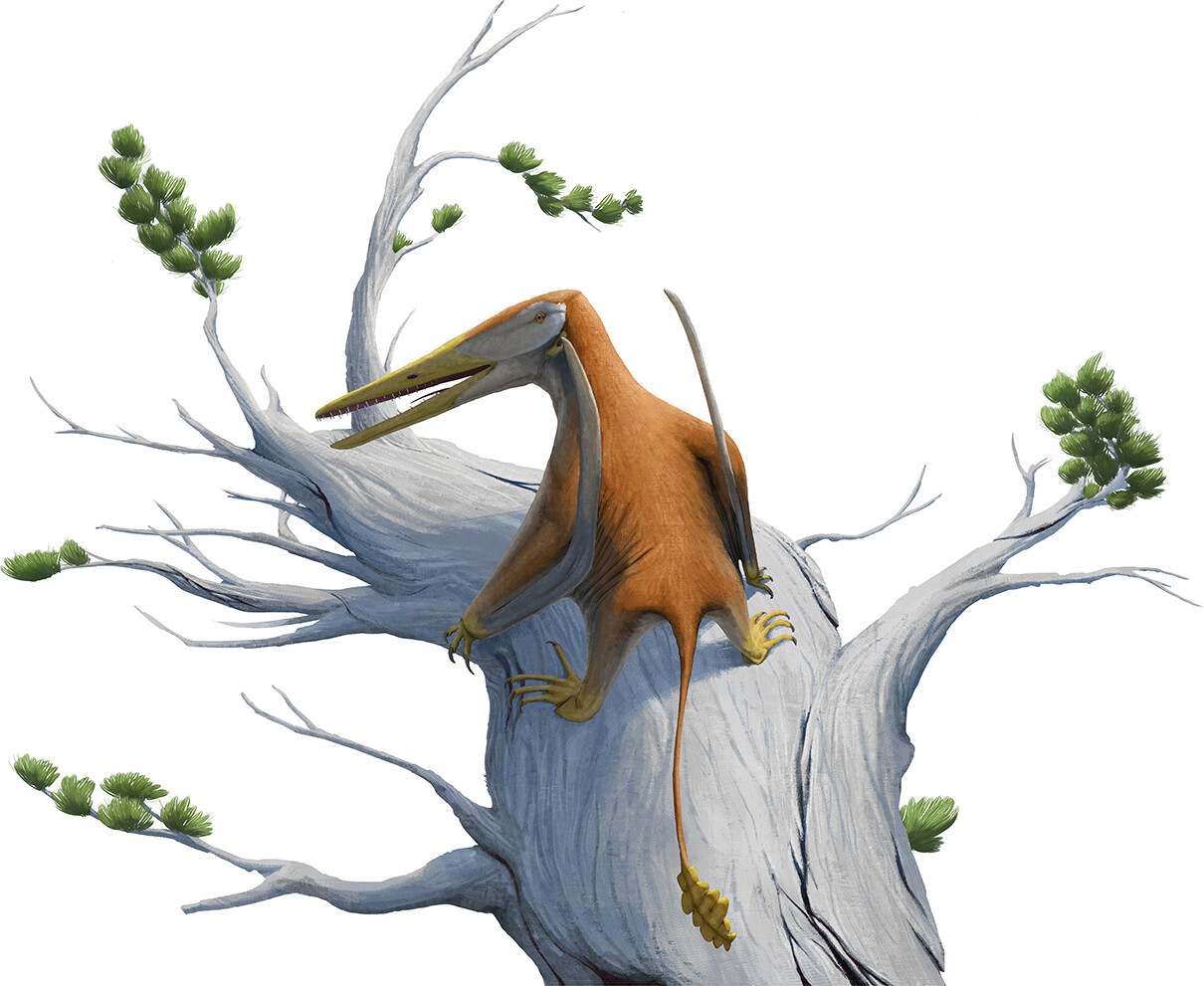
Life restoration of early monofenestratan Melkamter

Below is a cladogram showing the results of a phylogenetic analysis presented by Andres, Clark & Xu, 2014. This study found the two traditional groupings of ctenochasmatoids and kin as an early branching group (represented as the group Archaeopterodactyloidea), with all other pterodactyloids grouped into the Eupterodactyloidea.

- Pterodactylomorpha
  - Sordes
  - Monofenestrata
    - Darwinoptera
      - Pterorhynchus
      - Wukongopteridae
    - Pterodactyliformes
      - Changchengopterus
      - Caelidracones
        - Anurognathidae
        - Pterodactyloidea
          - Archaeopterodactyloidea
          - Eupterodactyloidea

Contrastingly, a 2024 paper by David Hone and colleagues describing the transitional taxon Skiphosoura found primitive monofenestratans to represent an evolutionary grade leading towards Pterodactyloidea, rather than a distinct darwinopteran or wukongopterid grouping. A cladogram of their results is shown below.

- Monofenestrata/Darwinoptera
  - Pterorhynchus
  - - "Darwinopterus" robustodens
    - - - Darwinopterus modularis
        - Cuspicephalus
      - Pterodactyliformes
        - "Kunpengopterus" antipollicatus
        - - Wukongopteridae (Wukongopterus and IVPP V 17959)
          - - "Darwinopterus" linglongtaensis
            - - IVPP V 23674
              - - Kunpengopterus
                - - Changchengopterus
                  - - Skiphosoura
                    - - Douzhanopterus
                      - - "Rhamphodactylus"
                        - - Propterodactylus
                          - Pterodactyloidea

== Distribution ==
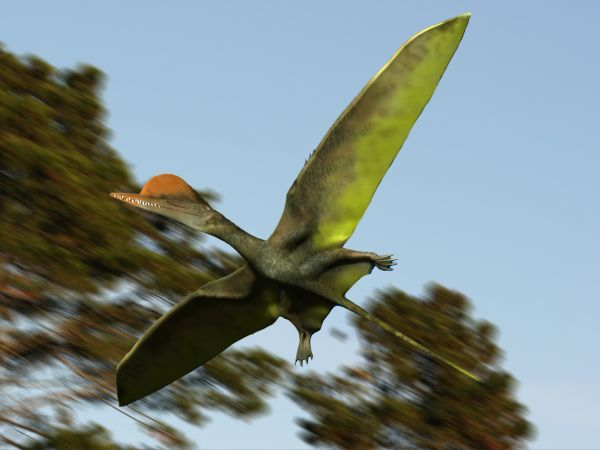
Life restoration of wukongopterid Darwinopterus in flight

The earliest known monofenestratan fossils have been found in the Stonesfield Slate formation of the United Kingdom, which dates to the Bathonian stage of the Middle Jurassic, dated to about 166 million years ago. Identified elements include cervical vertebrae, fourth metacarpals and a possible pterodactyloid synsacrum. An earlier undescribed taxon along with the coeval and corregional Allkaruen may also belong to the group, both reported from Middle Toarcian layers of the Cañadón Asfalto Formation of Argentina.
