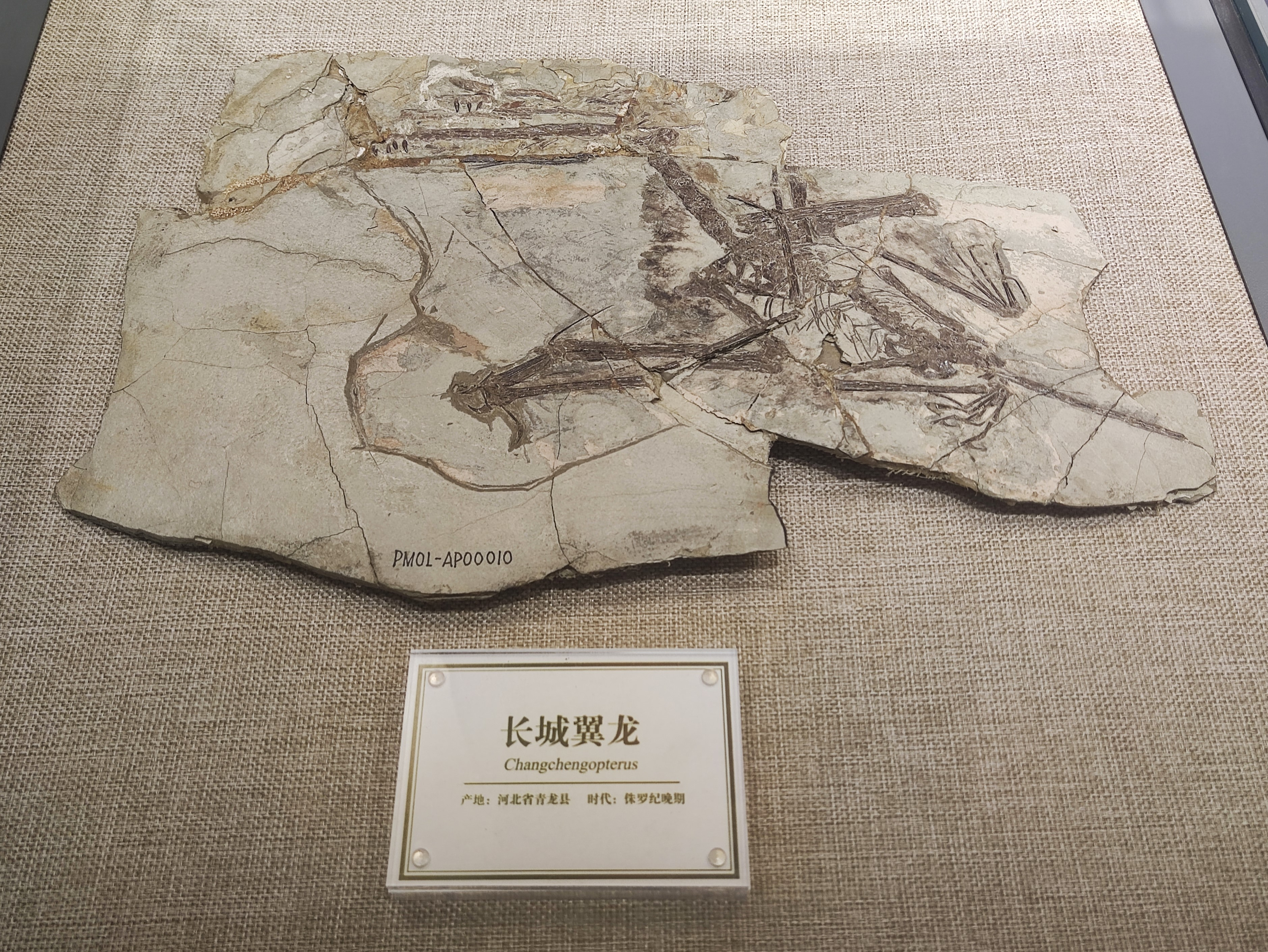
- Fossil in Liaoning Palaeontological Museum

Scientific classification
- Kingdom: Animalia
- Phylum: Chordata
- Order: †Pterosauria
- Clade: †Pterodactyliformes
- Genus: †Changchengopterus; Lü, 2009

Type species
- †Changchengopterus pani Lü, 2009

= Changchengopterus =

Changchengopterus Temporal range: Middle Jurassic, 163 Ma

Genus of pterosaur from the Late Jurassic

Changchengopterus is a genus of non-pterodactyloid pterosaur from Qinglong County in Hebei Province, China.

== Discovery and naming ==
The fossil specimen, holotype CYGB-0036, of the type and only species, Changchengopterus pani, was found in the Tiaojishan Formation dating from the Callovian and named and described by Lü Junchang in 2009. The generic name combines the Changcheng, the Great Wall of China, with a Latinised Greek pteron, "wing". The specific name honours Pan Lijun, who collected the fossil and donated it to science. The holotype, a skeleton lacking the skull, represents a young juvenile, of which the combined paired wing elements measure just seventeen centimetres. In 2011, a second specimen was described, PMOL-AP00010, acquired in 2008 by the Paleontological Museum of Liaoning. It consists of a skeleton with lower jaws, of an adult individual.

The wingspan of the referred specimen was in 2011 estimated at seventy centimetres. Already in 2010, some estimates for the genus had risen to 475 millimetres (18.7 in).

== Classification ==
In his original description, Lü's phylogenetic analysis concluded that Changchengopterus was a primitive pterosaur closely related to the earlier European pterosaur Dorygnathus, and he placed it in Rhamphorhynchidae. However, a subsequent study by Wang and colleagues (2010) noted some similarities with the wukongopterids, and they tentatively placed it in that family. Andres & Myers (2013) found it to be outside Wukongopteridae and slightly more closely related to the pterodactyloids within the larger group Monofenestrata. In 2017, Changchengopterus was recovered outside Monofenestrata. Contrastingly, a 2024 paper by David Hone and colleagues describing the transitional taxon Skiphosoura included Changchengopterus within Pterodactyliformes and found primitive monofenestratans to represent an evolutionary grade leading towards Pterodactyloidea, rather than a distinct darwinopteran or wukongopterid grouping. A cladogram of their results is shown below:

- Monofenestrata/Darwinoptera
  - Pterorhynchus
  - - "Darwinopterus" robustodens
    - - - Darwinopterus modularis
        - Cuspicephalus
      - Pterodactyliformes
        - "Kunpengopterus" antipollicatus
        - - Wukongopteridae (Wukongopterus and IVPP V 17959)
          - - "Darwinopterus" linglongtaensis
            - - IVPP V 23674
              - - Kunpengopterus
                - - Changchengopterus
                  - - Skiphosoura
                    - - Douzhanopterus
                      - - "Rhamphodactylus"
                        - - Propterodactylus
                          - Pterodactyloidea

== See also ==
- List of pterosaur genera
- Timeline of pterosaur research
