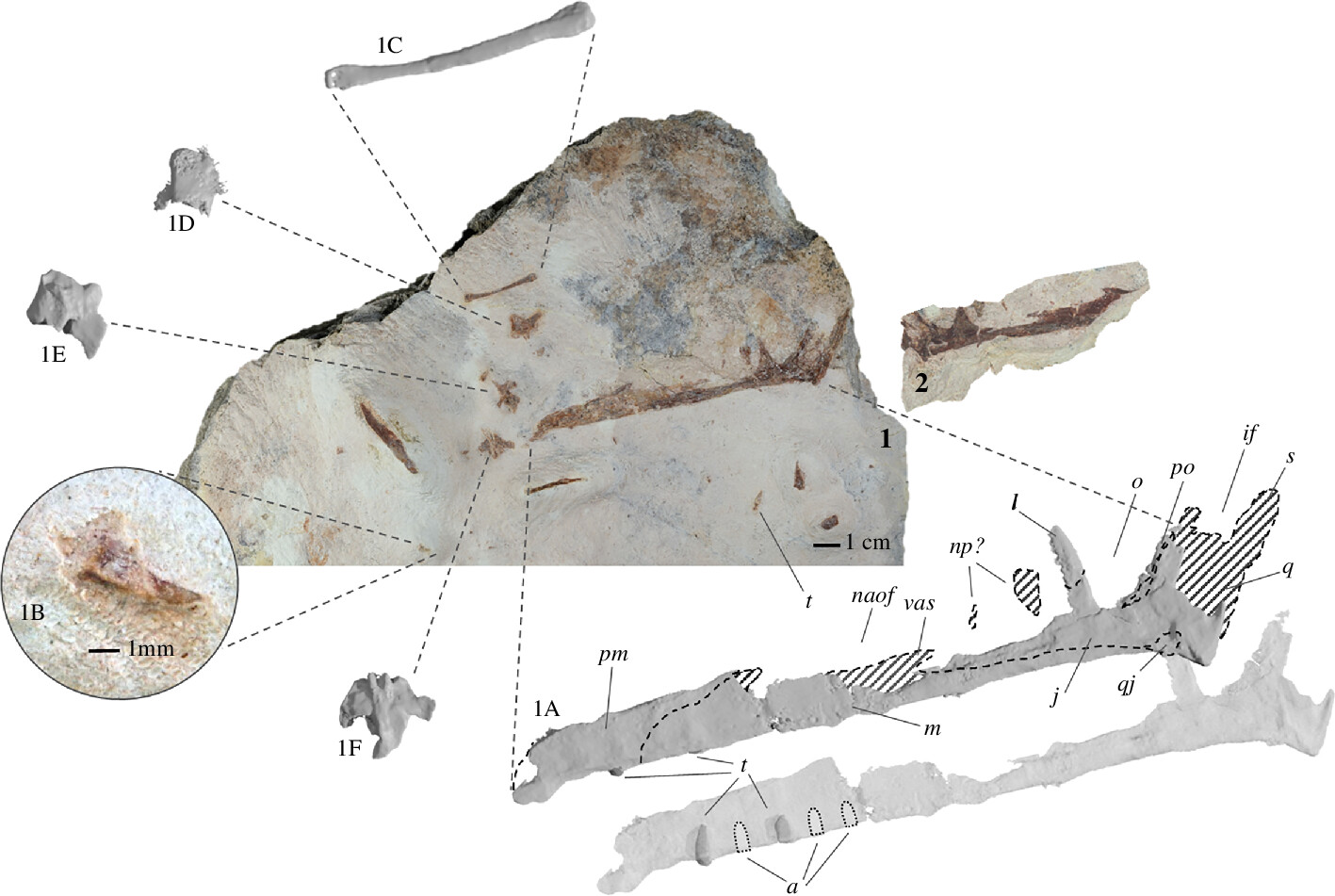
- Holotype specimen

Scientific classification
- Kingdom: Animalia
- Phylum: Chordata
- Class: Reptilia
- Order: †Pterosauria
- Clade: †Pterodactylomorpha
- Clade: †Monofenestrata
- Genus: †Melkamter; Fernandes, Pol & Rauhut, 2024
- Species: †M. pateko

Binomial name
- †Melkamter pateko Fernandes, Pol & Rauhut, 2024

= Melkamter =

Melkamter Temporal range: Early Jurassic, Toarcian

Genus of monofenestratan pterosaurs

Melkamter (Tehuelche pronunciation: [melkamter]) (meaning "winged lizard") is an extinct genus of monofenestratan pterosaurs from the Early Jurassic Cañadón Asfalto Formation of Argentina. The genus contains a single species, M. pateko, known from a partial skull and fragmentary postcranium. Melkamter represents the oldest known monofenestratan pterosaur in the fossil record.

== Discovery and naming ==
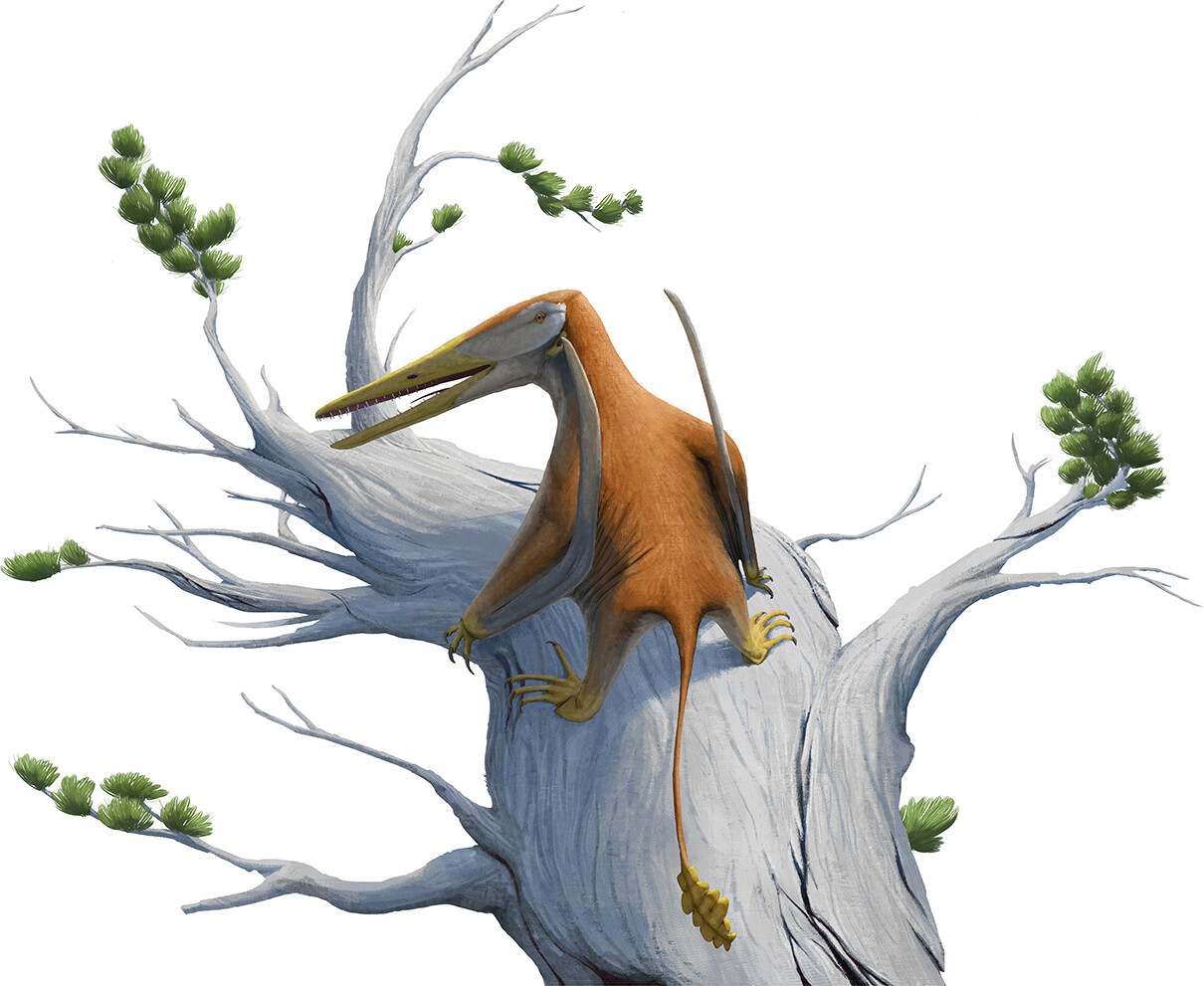
Speculative life restoration

The Melkamter holotype specimen, MPEF-PV 11530, was discovered in sediments of the Cañadón Asfalto Formation (Queso Rallado locality) near the Cerro Cóndor village of Chubut Province, Argentina. The specimen consists of a partial cranium preserved on a slab and counterslab, two teeth, four dorsal vertebrae, a wing metacarpal, and other unidentified bone fragments.

The fossil material was first reported at an academic conference in 2024 before its formal description.

In 2024, Fernandes, Pol & Rauhut described Melkamter pateko as a new genus and species of early monofenestratan pterosaurs based on these fossil remains. The generic name, Melkamter ([melkamter]), is derived from Tehuelche words mel, meaning "wing" and kamter, meaning "big lizard", referencing the etymology of clade Pterosauria (meaning "winged lizard" in Greek). The specific name, pateko ([pateko]), combines the Tehuelche words pate, meaning "rasped" and ko, meaning "set of bones", referencing the type locality (Queso Rallado, meaning "grated cheese") and the broken preservation of the holotype.

Melkamter is the fifth Jurassic pterosaur to be named from South America, following Herbstosaurus in 1975, Wenupteryx in 2013, the coeval Allkaruen in 2016, and Tacuadactylus in 2021.

== Description ==
The preserved skull of Melkamter is 131.3 millimetres (5.17 in) long.
