= Mörnsheim Formation =

Geological Formation in Germany

- Stratigraphic range: Tithonian
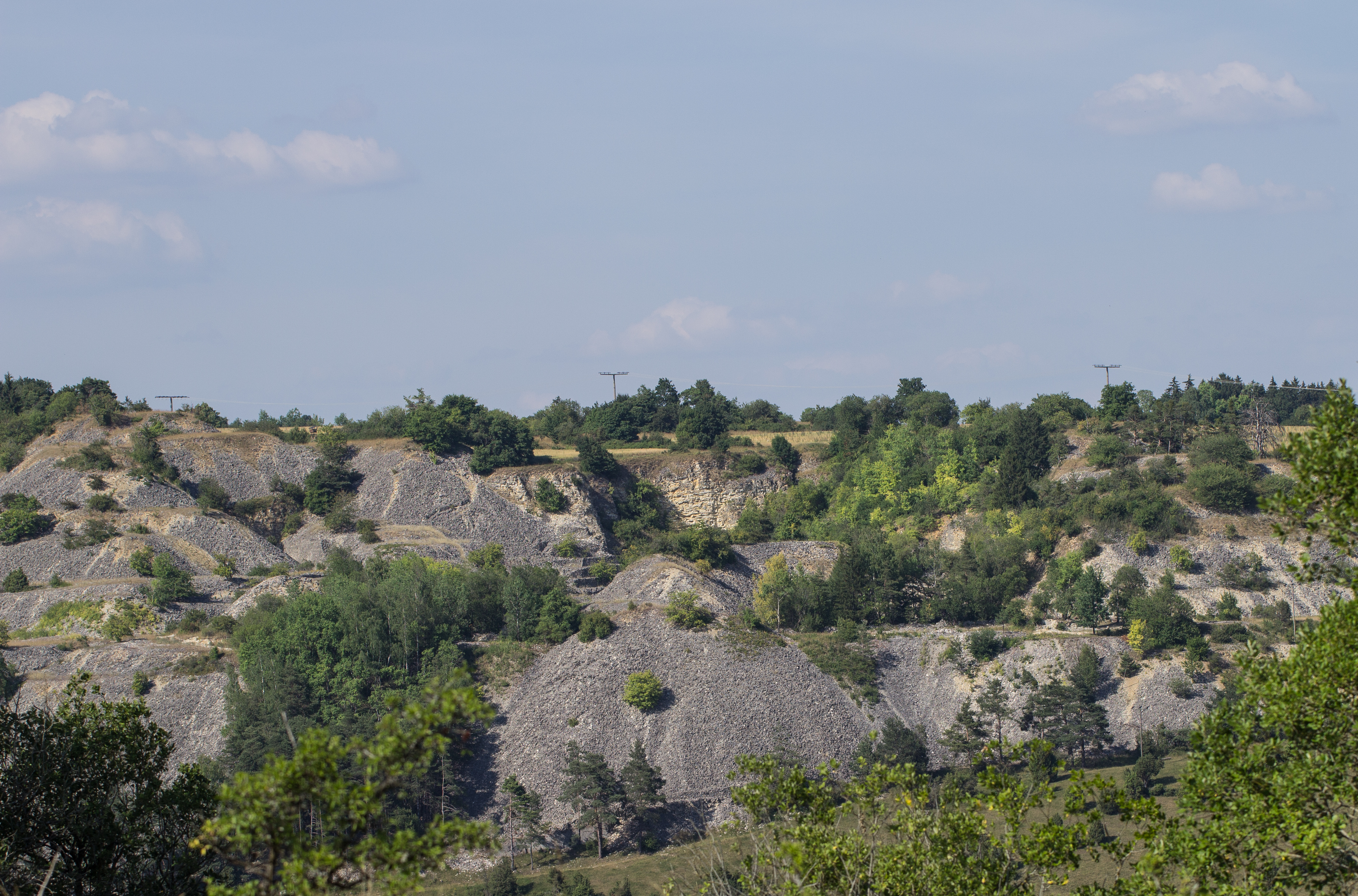
- Mörnsheim Formation
- Type: Formation
- Overlies: Altmühltal & Painten Formations

Lithology
- Primary: Limestone

Location
- Region: Bavaria
- Country: Germany

The Mörnsheim Formation is a geologic formation in Germany, near Daiting and Mörnsheim, Bavaria. It preserves fossils dating back to the Jurassic period. It overlies the older Altmühltal Formation in its northwestern extent, and the Painten Formation to the east.

== Paleofauna ==
- Aeolodon priscus
- Alcmonavis poeschli
- Altmuehlopterus rhamphastinus
- Archaeopteryx albersdoerferi
- Cricosaurus
- Geosaurus giganteus
- Laueropterus vitriolus
- Makrodactylus oligodontus
- Petrodactyle wellnhoferi
- Pleurosaurus goldfussi
- "Rhamphodactylus"
- Solnhofia parsonsi
- Skiphosoura bavarica

== See also ==
- List of fossiliferous stratigraphic units in Germany
