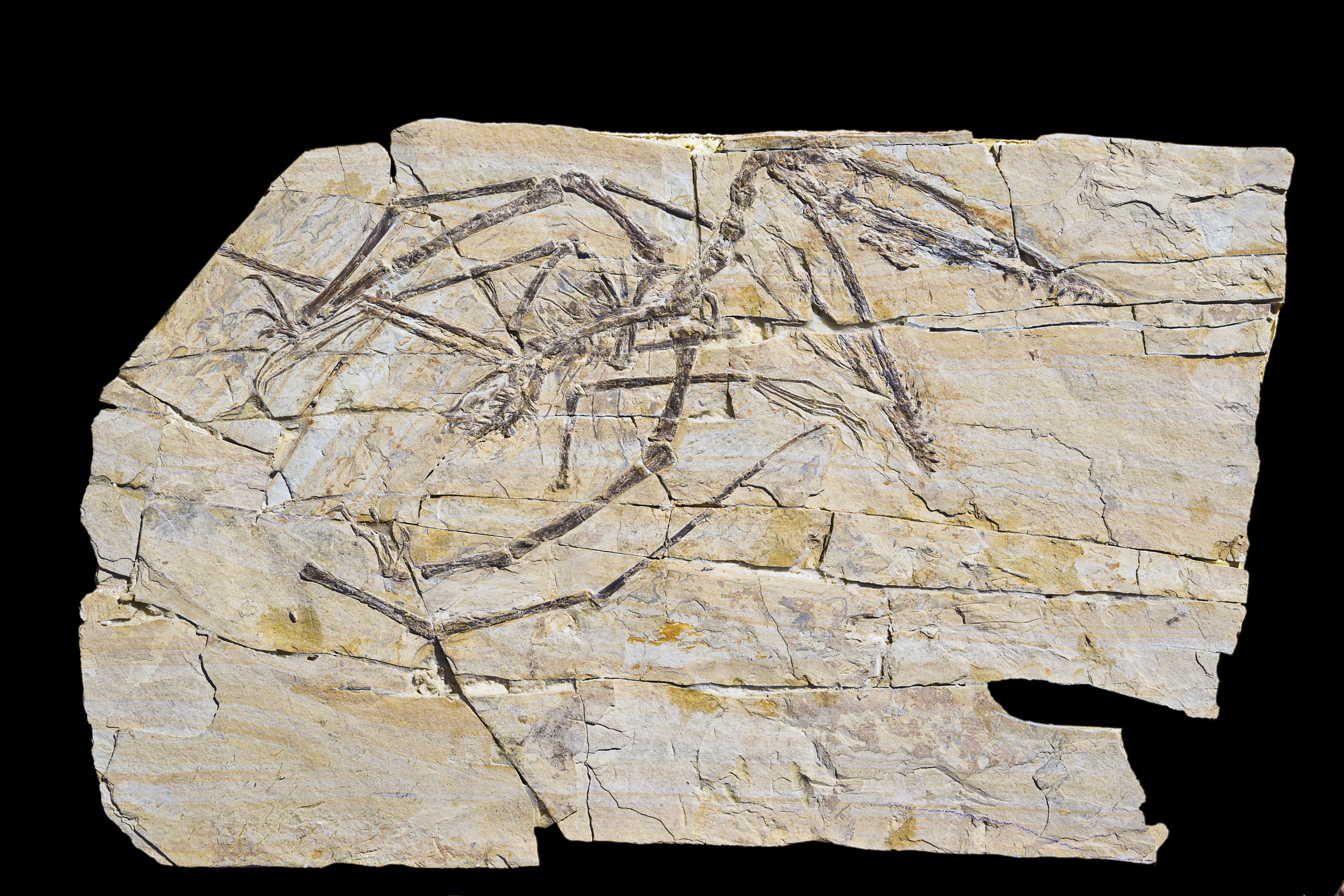
- D. modularis fossil

Scientific classification
- Kingdom: Animalia
- Phylum: Chordata
- Class: Reptilia
- Order: †Pterosauria
- Family: †Wukongopteridae
- Subfamily: †Wukongopterinae
- Genus: †Darwinopterus; Lü et al., 2010

Type species
- †Darwinopterus modularis Lü et al., 2010

Other species
- †D. camposi Cheng et al., 2025; †D. linglongtaensis? Wang et al, 2010; †D. robustodens? Lü et al., 2011

= Darwinopterus =

Darwinopterus Temporal range: Middle Jurassic, 160.9–160.3 Ma

Genus of wukongopterid pterosaurs

Darwinopterus (meaning "Darwin's wing") is a genus of pterosaur, discovered in China and named after biologist Charles Darwin. Between 30 and 40 fossil specimens have been identified, all collected from the Tiaojishan Formation, which dates to the middle Jurassic period, 160.89–160.25 Ma ago. The type species, D. modularis, was described in February 2010. D. modularis was the first known pterosaur to display features of both long-tailed ("rhamphorhynchoid") and short-tailed (pterodactyloid) pterosaurs, and was described as a transitional fossil between the two groups. Three additional species, D. camposi, D. linglongtaensis, and D. robustodens, were described from the same fossil beds in February 2025, December 2010, and June 2011, respectively.

== Description ==
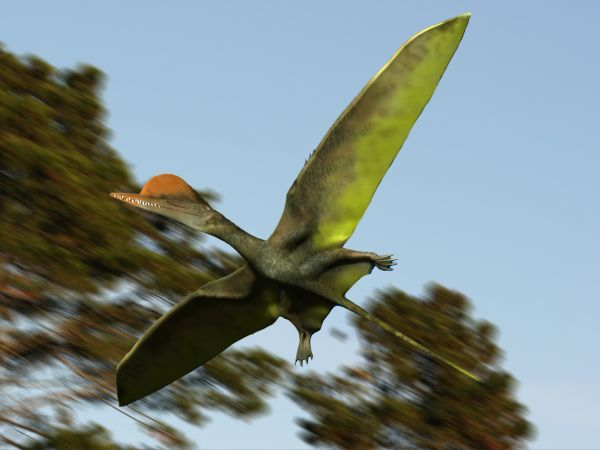
Restoration of a crested D. modularis

Darwinopterus, like its closest relatives, is characterized by its unique combination of basal and derived pterosaurian features. While it had a long tail and other features characteristic of the 'rhamphorhynchoids', it also had distinct pterodactyloid features, such as long vertebrae in the neck and a single skull opening in front of the eyes, the nasoantorbital fenestra (in most 'rhamphorhynchoids', the antorbital fenestra and the nasal opening are separate).

Darwinopterus is distinguished from its close relatives by the greater relative length of the back portion of the skull compared to its jaws, thin nasal bone, and elongated hip bone (ilium). The teeth in all species were spaced widely with the longest teeth at the jaw tips. The teeth were spike-like in form, and set into tooth sockets with raised margins. The hand bones were relatively short, even shorter than the femur. The tail was long, with over 20 vertebrae, and was partially stiffened by long, thin bony projections. Unlike other wukongopterids, the head crest found in males was supported by a thin bony extension of the skull, with a serrated top edge. The serrations probably helped anchor an even larger keratin extension.

=== Species ===
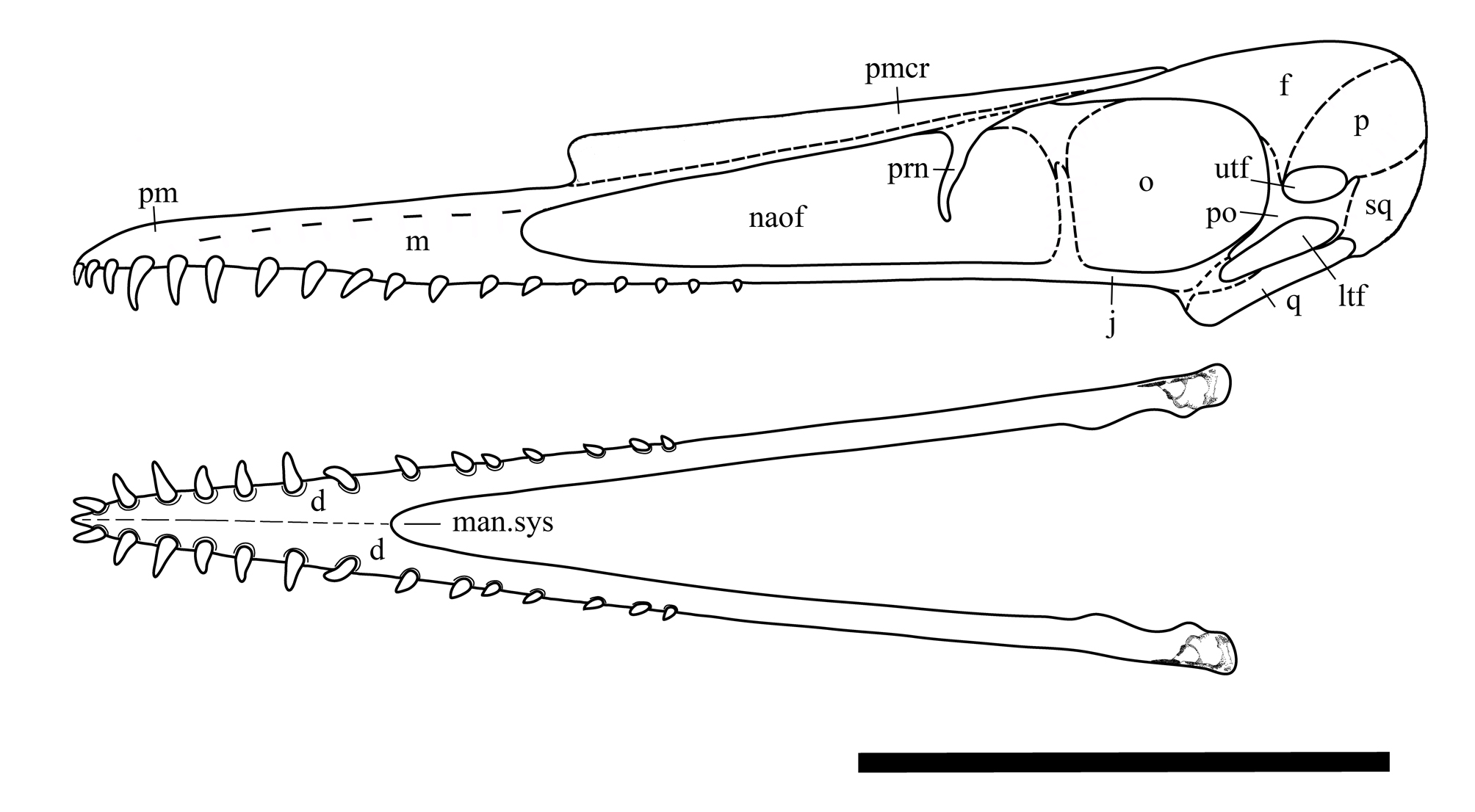
Skull and lower mandible of D. camposi

Specimens of Darwinopterus have been divided into four distinct species, based largely on the size and shape of their teeth. The first, D. modularis, was named by Lü Junchang and colleagues in 2010. D. modularis had an especially elongated back end to the skull, and widely spaced, "spike-like" teeth. Later, D. linglongtaensis was named by Wang Xiaolin and colleagues in the same year. It was characterized by a shorter and taller skull and shorter, cone-shaped teeth. In 2011, Lü and another team of scientists described and named D. robustodens, for a new specimen with very robust teeth.

Some later work has noted the extreme similarity between these three species. A 2021 paper by Xuanyu Zhou and colleagues argued that the differences in dentition between D. modularis and D. rubustodens are due to taphonomic tooth slippage in the former (with "D. robustodens" representing the natural anatomy), and that differences seen in D. linglongtaensis compared to D. modularis are due to being based on a younger individual with ontogenetic differences in anatomy. Therefore, they considered D. modularis to be the only valid species in the genus, with the other two being junior synonyms.

In 2025, Xin Cheng and colleagues described a new species D. camposi based on a nearly complete, adult specimen (IVPP V 17957). It has more teeth than other species, with eighteen in the upper jaw and fourteen in the lower jaw; other wukongopterids have ten or eleven teeth in their upper jaws. The bony crest of D. camposi has a straight front edge, lacking a projection at the front, and has a smooth surface unlike the rough texture of other species. The fourth phalange of the wing finger (the outermost bone) is shorter than the first (the innermost finger bone), unique among species of Darwinopterus.

== Classification ==
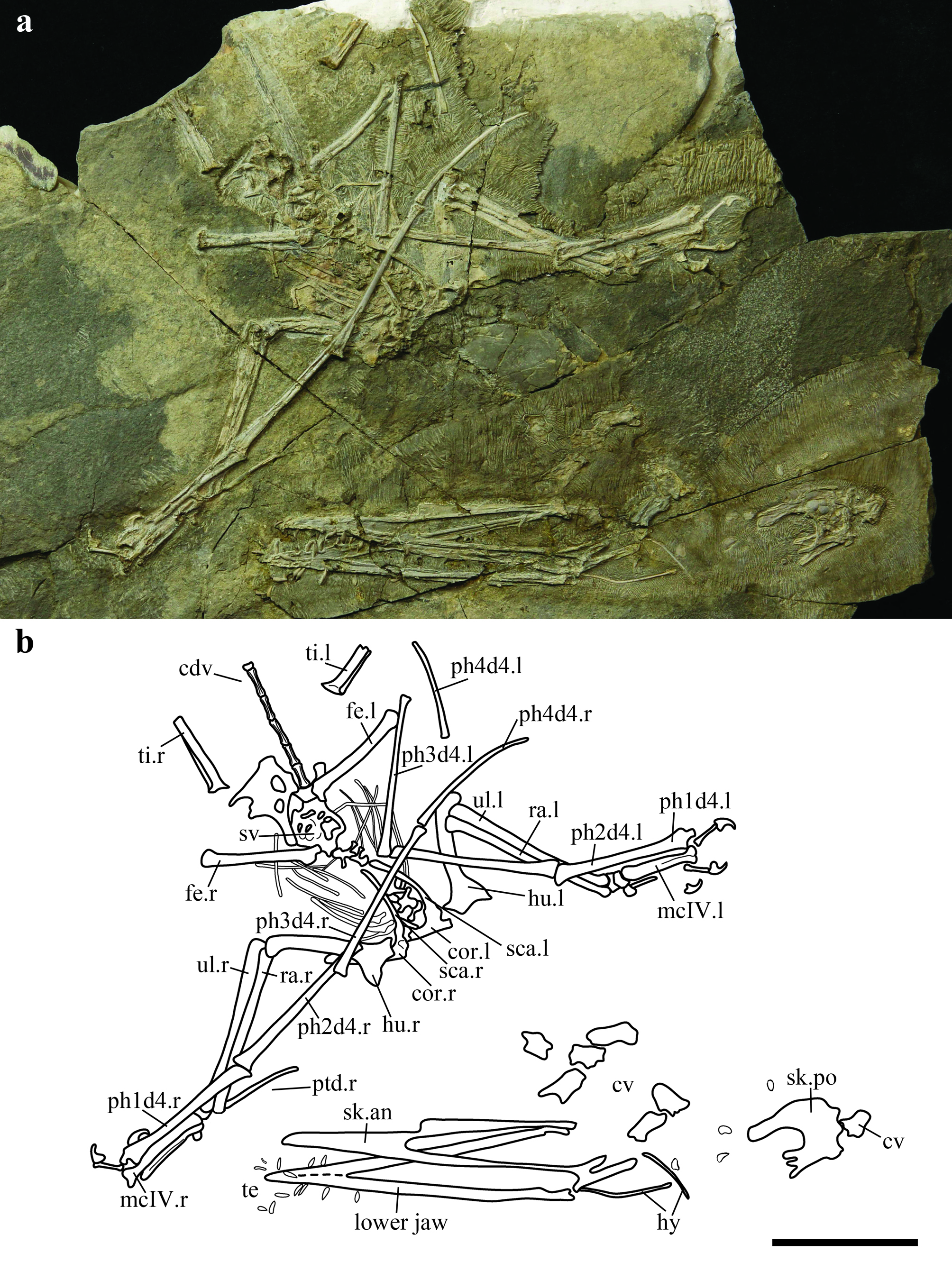
Skeleton of D. camposi

Below is a cladogram following Wang et al. (2017)

- Monofenestrata
  - Wukongopterus lii
  - - Darwinopterus
      - Darwinopterus modularis
      - Darwinopterus robustodens
      - Darwinopterus linglongtaensis
    - - Kunpengopterus sinensis
      - - Douzhanopterus zhangi
        - - "Painten pro-pterodactyloid" (Propterodactylus)
          - Pterodactyloidea

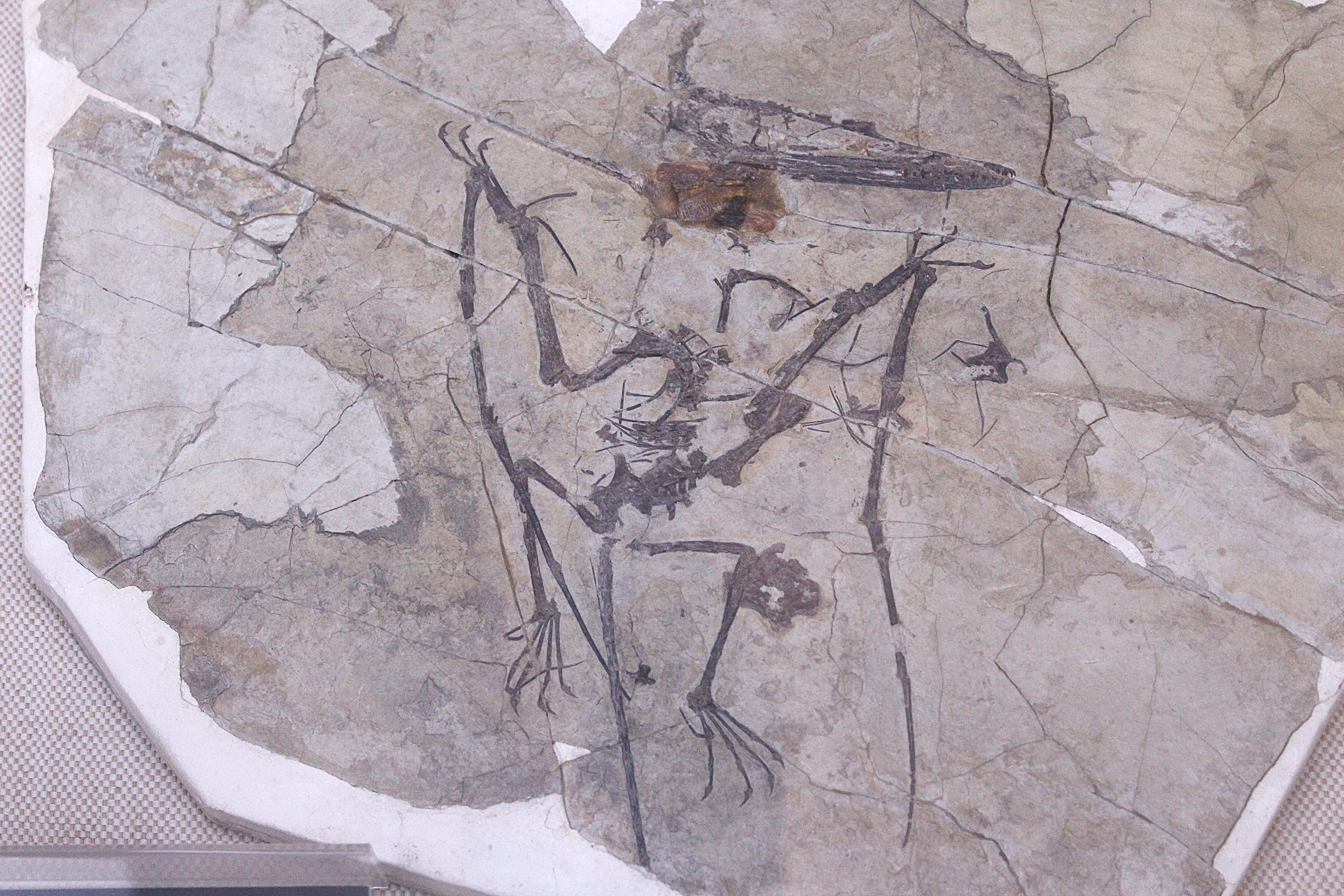
Holotype (IVPP V16049) of D. linglongtaensis, Paleozoological Museum of China

In 2024, it has been suggested that the genus Darwinopterus is polyphyletic based on phylogenetic analyses by Hone et al. (2024), who recovered the other three species in various positions. A cladogram of their results is shown below.

- Monofenestrata/Darwinoptera
  - Pterorhynchus
  - - "Darwinopterus" robustodens
    - - - Darwinopterus modularis
        - Cuspicephalus
      - Pterodactyliformes
        - "Kunpengopterus" antipollicatus
        - - Wukongopteridae (Wukongopterus and IVPP V 17959)
          - - "Darwinopterus" linglongtaensis
            - - IVPP V 23674
              - - Kunpengopterus
                - - Changchengopterus
                  - - Skiphosoura
                    - - Douzhanopterus
                      - - "Rhamphodactylus"
                        - - Propterodactylus
                          - Pterodactyloidea

=== Evolutionary implications ===
As the name Darwinopterus modularis implies, the researchers who first described this genus saw it as evidence that pterodactyloid pterosaurs evolved from the more primitive 'rhamphorhynchoids' via modular evolution. In other words, rather than a gradual change from one body type to the other, various major aspects of pterodactyloid anatomy arose unsystematically, producing species with distinct combinations of both primitive and advanced features.

== Biology ==
Because Darwinopterus is known from numerous well-preserved specimens including an egg, researchers have been able to deduce various aspects of its biology, including growth patterns and life history, reproduction, and possible variation between sexes.

=== Sexual variation ===
The large amount of variation among Darwinopterus specimens has been interpreted as sexual dimorphism. The first Darwinopterus specimen in which sex could be confidently identified was specimen ZMNH M8802 in the collections of the Zhejiang Museum of Natural History, nicknamed "Mrs T" (short for "Mrs Pterodactyl"), described by Lü Junchang and colleagues in January 2011. This specimen was preserved with the impression of an egg between its thighs in close association with its pelvis. This specimen had a broad pelvis and lacked any evidence of a crest. The egg was probably expelled from the body during decomposition, and its association with the Darwinopterus individual was used to support the hypothesis of sexual dimorphism.

However, this hypothesis has been criticized. Pterosaur researcher Kevin Padian questioned some of the conclusions drawn by Lü et al., suggesting in a 2011 interview that, in other animals with elaborate display crests (such as ceratopsian dinosaurs), the size and shape of the crests change dramatically with age. He noted that the "Mrs T" specimen may simply have been a sub-adult which had not yet developed a crest (most animals are able to reproduce before they are fully grown). In 2015, Wang e.a. reassigned the "Mrs T" specimen to Kunpengopterus, and in 2021 it was classified as a specimen of the new species Kunpengopterus antipollicatus. Furthermore, a rigorous analysis of wukongopterid variation published in 2017 noted that crests among wukongopterids were subject to a large amount of individual variation, and that there was no consistent dimorphism in the pelvic anatomy of crested and uncrested wukongopterid specimens.

=== Reproduction ===
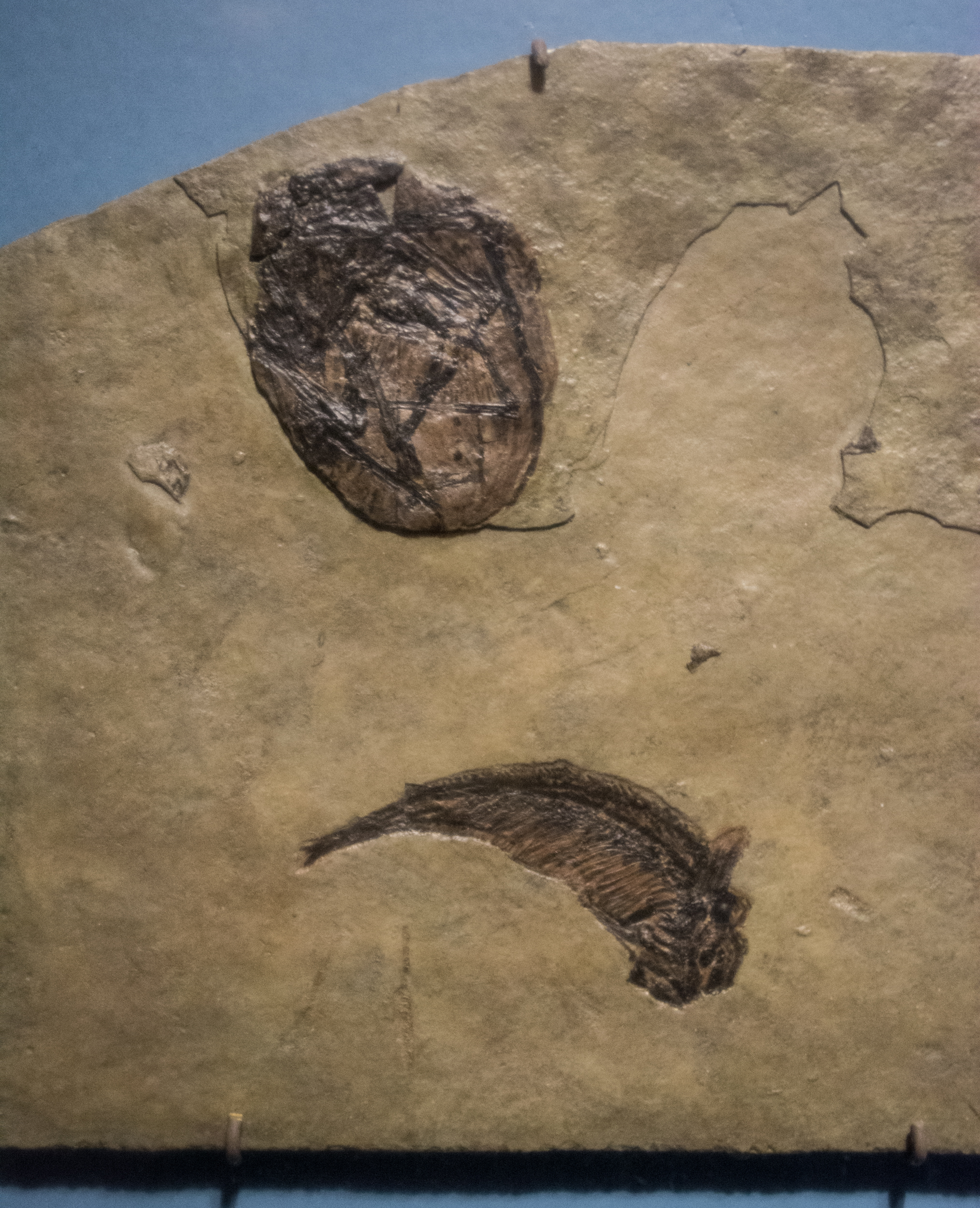
Darwinopterus egg, preserved with a fish

The specimen preserved along with an egg (nicknamed "Mrs T"), described by Lü and colleagues in 2011, offers insight into the reproductive strategies of Darwinopterus and pterosaurs in general. Like the eggs of later pterosaurs and modern reptiles, the eggs of Darwinopterus had a parchment-like, soft shell. In modern birds, the eggshell is hardened with calcium, completely shielding the embryo from the outside environment. Soft-shelled eggs are permeable, and allow significant amounts of water to be absorbed into the egg during development. Eggs of this type are more vulnerable to the elements and are typically buried in soil. The eggs of Darwinopterus would have weighed about 6 grams (0.21 oz) when they were laid, but due to moisture intake, they may have doubled in weight by the time of hatching. The eggs were small compared to the size of the mother (the "Mrs T" specimen weighed between 110 grams [3.9 oz] and 220 grams [7.8 oz]), also more like modern reptiles than birds. David Unwin, a co-author of the paper, suggested that Darwinopterus probably laid many small eggs at a time and buried them, and that juveniles could fly upon hatching, requiring little to no parental care. These results imply that reproduction in pterosaurs was more like that in modern reptiles and significantly differed from reproduction in birds. However, in 2015, the counterplate of the specimen was reported, IVPP V18403, which showed a single additional egg present in the body, indicating that there were two active ovaries, each of which producing a single egg at a time.

=== Diet ===
Darwinopterus, like most wukongopterids, is a terrestrial pterosaur lacking speciations for piscivory; ergo, it was early on recognised to have been a terrestrial form. Originally, it was described as a raptorial hawking carnivore; however, posterior analyses have found no speciations towards aerial predation. Instead, it appears to have been a saltatorial insectivore, hopping around both in the trees and on the ground, akin to some modern songbirds. Lü and colleagues (2011) suggested that these differences in tooth shape may indicate that each Darwinopterus species occupied a different ecological niche, with the teeth of each becoming specialized for different food sources. The robust teeth of D. robustodens, for example, may have been used to feed on hard-shelled beetles.

== See also ==
- List of pterosaur genera
- Timeline of pterosaur research
- Wukongopterus
- 2010 in paleontology
