= Painten Formation =

Geological formation in Bavaria, Germany

- Stratigraphic range: early Tithonian; ~150–148 Ma
- Type: Formation
- Sub-units: Öchselberg member
- Underlies: Mörnsheim Formation
- Overlies: Torleite Formation

Lithology
- Primary: Limestone
- Other: Mudstone

Location
- Coordinates: 48.9°N 11.6°E
- Approximate paleocoordinates: 40.2°N 19.6°E
- Region: Bavaria
- Country: Germany

Type section
- Named for: Painten, near Kelheim
- Painten Formation (Germany)

The Painten Formation is a geologic formation in Germany. It preserves fossils dating back to the Tithonian stage of the Late Jurassic period.

== Description ==
It is roughly contemporary with the Altmühltal Formation (which includes the true Solnhofen limestone), as they both underlay the Mörnsheim Formation. The 12th specimen, or "Schamhaupten specimen", of Archaeopteryx was uncovered in the lower portion of the Painten Formation. Other dinosaurs found here include Juravenator, Ostromia and possibly Compsognathus.

== Fossil content ==
The following fossils have been reported from the formation:

=== Reptiles ===
- Schoenesmahl dyspepsia
- Dakosaurus maximus
- Eurysternum wagleri
- Juravenator starki
- Leptosaurus pulchellus
- Ostromia crassipes
- Solnhofia parsonsi
- Archaeopteryx sp.
- Compsognathus longipes
- Propterodactylus
- Rhamphorhynchus sp.
- Eurysternidae indet.
- Ichthyosauria indet.

=== Fish ===
Chondrichthyes

- Paracestracion viohli

Osteichthyes

- Anaethalion zapporum
- Ascalabothrissops voelkli
- Scheenstia zappi
- Undina penicillata
- Voelklichthys comitatus
- Allothrissops sp.
- Gyrodus sp.
- Leptolepis sp.
- ?Elopsomolos sp.

=== Invertebrates ===
Echinoids

- Pygaster sp.
- Echinoidea indet.

Crinoids

- Saccocoma tenella
- Millericrinus sp.

Corals

- Muensteria vermicularis
- Scleractinia indet.

=== Flora ===
- Crescentiella morronensis
- Cycadopteris jurensis
- Araucarites sp.
- Brachyphyllum sp.
- Goniolina sp.
- Sphenopteris sp.
- Phaeophyceae indet.

== See also ==
- List of fossiliferous stratigraphic units in Germany
