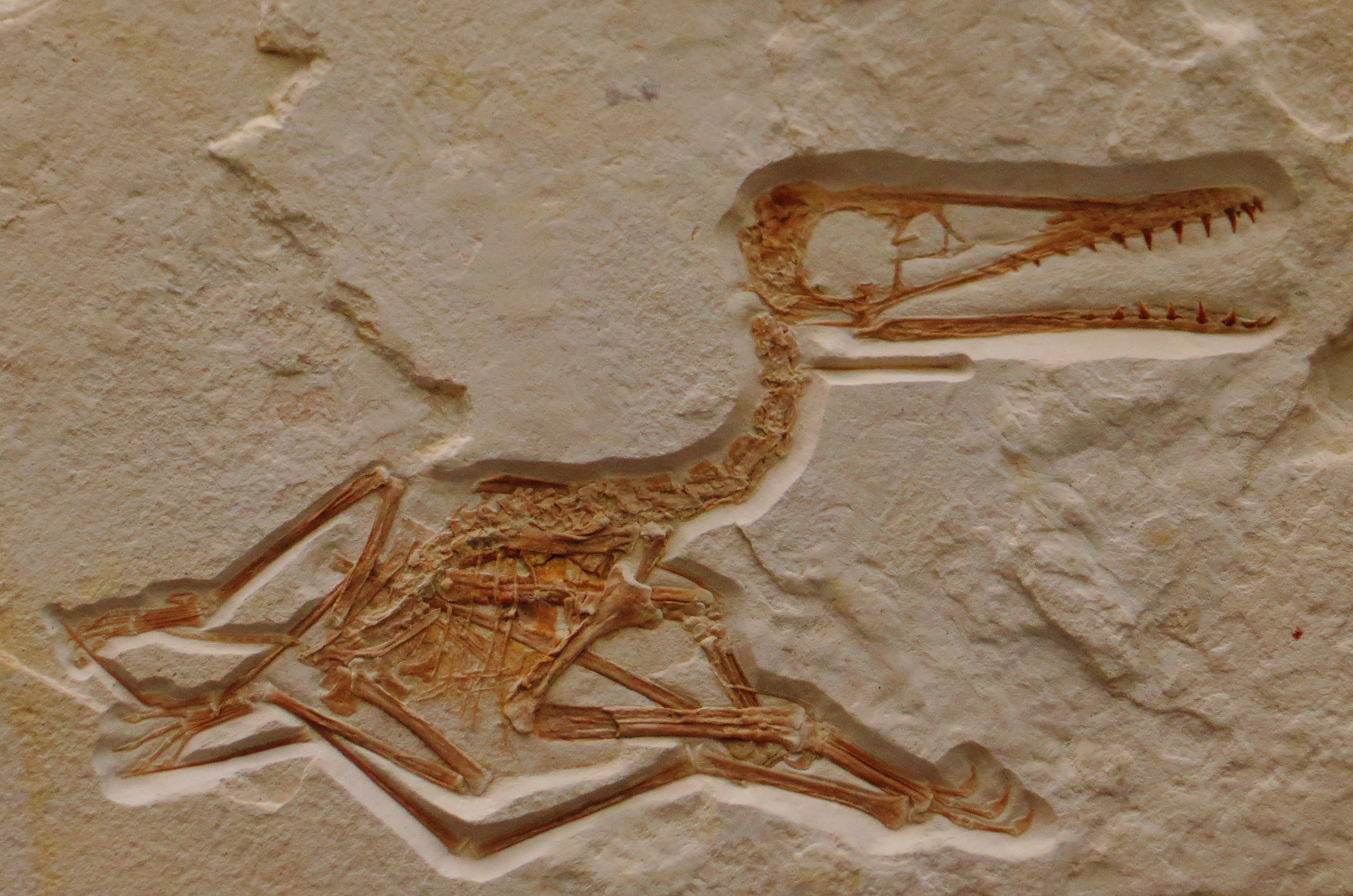
- Holotype specimen

Scientific classification
- Kingdom: Animalia
- Phylum: Chordata
- Order: †Pterosauria
- Clade: †Caelidracones (?)
- Suborder: †Pterodactyloidea (?)
- Genus: †Propterodactylus; Spindler, 2024
- Species: †P. frankerlae

Binomial name
- †Propterodactylus frankerlae Spindler, 2024

= Propterodactylus =

Propterodactylus Temporal range: Late Jurassic (upper Kimmeridgian), ~150 Ma

Genus of transitional pterosaurs

Propterodactylus (meaning "before Pterodactylus") is an extinct genus of transitional monofenestratan pterosaurs from the Late Jurassic Painten Formation of Germany. The genus contains a single species, P. frankerlae, known from a complete articulated skeleton. Before its naming, Propterodactylus was referred to as the "Painten pro-pterodactyloid" in the scientific literature.

== Discovery and naming ==
The Propterodactylus holotype specimen, DMA-JP-2011/006, was discovered in April 2011 in the Rygol lime works quarry of the Painten Formation (Ulmense subzone) near Painten in Bavaria, Germany. The nearly-perfect specimen consists of an articulated complete skeleton with preserved soft tissues.

In 2024, Frederik Spindler described Propterodactylus frankerlae as a new genus and species of monofenestratan pterosaur based on these fossil remains. The generic name, Propterodactylus, combines the Ancient Greek suffix "προ-" ("pro-"), meaning "before", with the genus name Pterodactylus (derived from Greek words meaning "wing digit"). As such, the name references its position as a "forerunner" to the Pterodactyloidea, as well as its long-standing nickname as the "Painten pro-pterodactyloid". The specific name, frankerlae, honours Petra Hahn, née Frankerl, the deceased wife of Stephan Hahn, the discoverer of the Propterodactylus holotype.

== Description ==
The holotype specimen of Propterodactylus belongs to either a juvenile or subadult individual. As such, it had not reached full skeletal maturity. The lack of fusion in several skeletal elements, such as the synsacrum, scapulocoracoid, carpals, and ischiopubic plate, indicate that the animal was not fully grown. However, the general robusticity of the bones and the presence of large carpals and tarsals indicate that it was also not a young juvenile. The total length of the holotype skull is 9.3 centimetres (3.7 in), and it has a wingspan of approximately 55 centimetres (22 in).

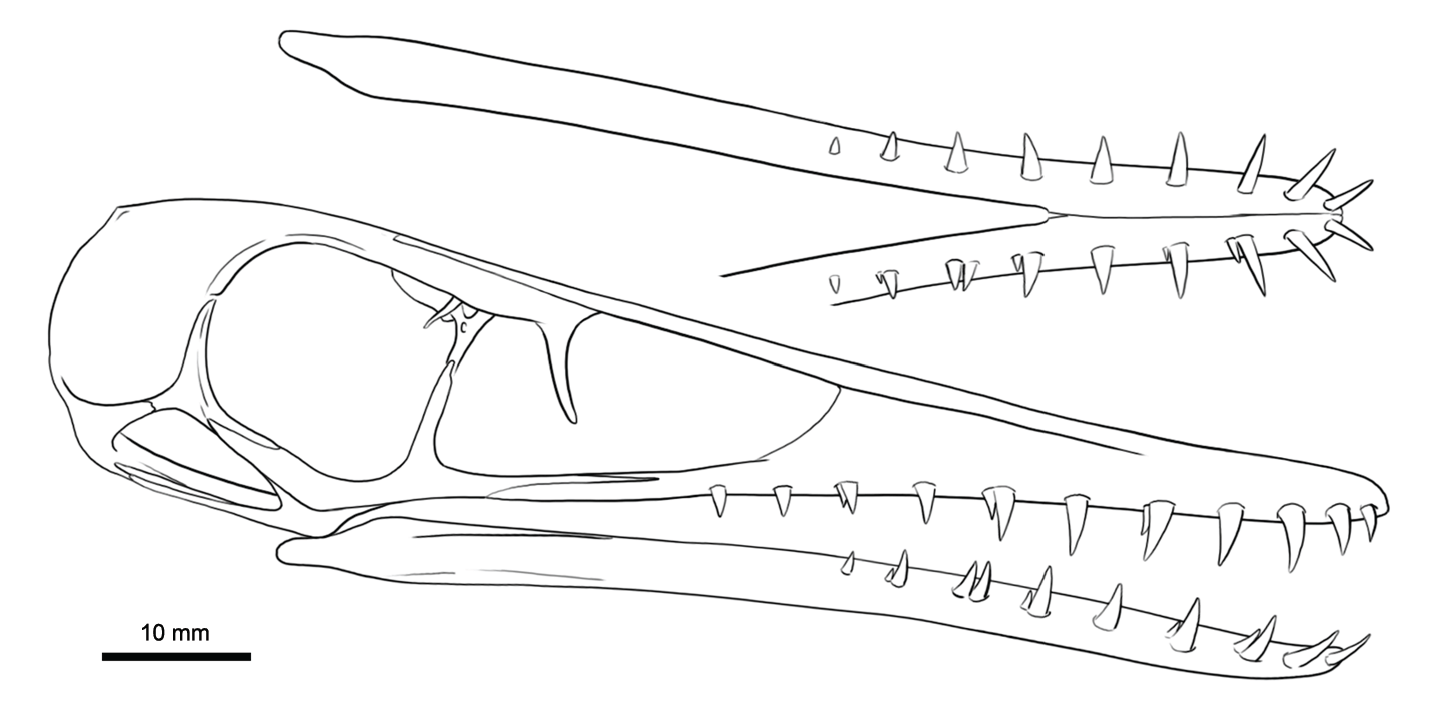
Reconstructed skull of Propterodactylus

Despite the 'transitional' nature of the Propterodactylus holotype, the skull has several features otherwise seen only in later diverging ctenochasmatoids, such as a nearly-circular orbit, a round posterior region of the skull, and generally horizontal occipital region. In general, the skull is most proportionally similar to Pterodactylus.

== Classification ==
Based on the mosaic of features observed in the Propterodactylus holotype, it can be confidently regarded as transitional between the more basal monofenestratans such as darwinopterans and the later diverging lophocratian pterodactyloids. Several phylogenetic analyses have been conducted that include Propterodactylus (as the "Painten pro-pterodactyloid"), recovering generally similar results. Most recent studies have found Propterodactylus within the Pterodactyloidea, rather than the sister taxon to it. The results of Andres (2021) are displayed in the cladogram below, with Propterodactylus as the sister taxon to the Lophocratia within Pterodactyloidea, diverging after the fragmentary Kryptodrakon. Pêgas (2024) independently recovered the same relationships, but with anurognathids outside of the Monofenestrata. Similarly, Dalla Vecchia (2022) found Propterodactylus to be the basalmost pterodactyloid in an analysis with a smaller sample size, with the Darwinoptera as the sister taxon to Changchengopterus + Pterodactyloidea within the Monofenestrata.

- Monofenestrata
  - Darwinoptera
  - Pterodactyliformes
    - Changchengopterus
    - Caelidracones
      - Anurognathidae
      - Pterodactyloidea
        - Kryptodrakon
        - - Propterodactylus
          - Lophocratia
            - Archaeopterodactyloidea
              - - Cuspicephalus
                - Germanodactylus spp.
              - Euctenochasmatia
                - Pterodactylus
                - Ctenochasmatoidea
            - Eupterodactyloidea
              - Haopterus
              - Ornithocheiroidea
                - Pteranodontoidea
                - Azhdarchoidea

Some older studies, such as Vidovic & Martill (2018), discussed the Propterodactylus fossil material as belonging to a non-pterodactyloid immediately basal to the clade's divergence. Similarly, Wang et al. (2017) recovered Propterodactylus as the sister taxon to the Pterodactyloidea, with Douzhanopterus as the sister to this clade. They further noted morphological similarities between Douzhanopterus and Propterodactylus indicating the "intermediate" status of both taxa.

Later in 2024, Smyth et al. analyzed the evolution of the manus and pes in pterosaurs. They noted that in all pterodactyliforms except for Propterodactylus, the ratio of the toe bones exceeds that of the finger bones. In this way, Propterodactylus is more similar to more basal taxa. They reconstructed the ancestral character-states for pterosaur hand and foot proportions. The results of their tree are displayed in the cladogram below, with Propterodactylus as the basalmost pterodactyliform:

- Monofenestrata
  - Darwinoptera
  - Pterodactyliformes
    - Propterodactylus
    - - Douzhanopterus
      - Pterodactyloidea
        - Diopecephalus
        - - Euctenochasmatia
          - Eupterodactyloidea
            - - "Ornithocheiromorpha"
              - Pteranodontia
            - - "Germanodactylidae"
              - - Dsungaripteridae
                - Azhdarchoidea

== See also ==
- Monofenestrata
- Kryptodrakon
- Transitional fossil
- Paleobiota of the Solnhofen Limestone
- 2024 in archosaur paleontology
