= Skiphosoura =

Skiphosoura Temporal range: Late Jurassic, lower Tithonian

Scientific classification
- Domain: Eukaryota
- Kingdom: Animalia
- Phylum: Chordata
- Order: †Pterosauria
- Clade: †Pterodactyliformes
- Genus: †Skiphosoura; Hone et al., 2024
- Species: †S. bavarica

Binomial name
- †Skiphosoura bavarica Hone et al., 2024

Genus of pterodactyliform pterosaurs

Skiphosoura (meaning "sword tail") is an extinct genus of pterodactyliform pterosaurs from the Late Jurassic Mörnsheim Formation of Germany. The genus contains a single species, S. bavarica, known from a nearly complete skeleton including a partial skull. Skiphosoura exhibits a transitional body morphology between more basal pterosaurs and later pterodactyloids.

== Discovery and naming ==
Skiphosoura type locality in Mühlheim, Germany

The Skiphosoura holotype specimen, LF 4157, was discovered in 2015 in sediments of the Mörnsheim Formation (Schaudiberg Quarry, Dritter Kieselflinz Layer) near Solnhofen in Bavaria, Germany. After its preparation, the specimen was acquired in 2020 by the Illinois (USA)-based Lauer Foundation for Paleontology, where it is permanently reposited. The specimen is disarticulated but nearly complete, missing some metapodials, vertebrae, and part of the skull. Many of the bones are preserved three-dimensionally.

In 2024, Hone et al. described Skiphosoura bavarica as a new genus and species of pterodactyliform pterosaurs based on these fossil remains. The generic name, Skiphosoura, combines the anglicized Ancient Greek words skyphos, meaning "sword" and oura, meaning "tail", referencing the short, tapered caudal vertebrae of the taxon. The specific name, bavarica, references the discovery of the holotype in the German state of Bavaria. As such, the intended meaning of the full binomial is "sword tail from Bavaria."

== Description ==
Skiphosoura is notably larger than closely related pterosaurs. The holotype specimen has a wingspan of 1.75 metres (5.7 ft) but may not have been fully grown.

== Classification ==
In their phylogenetic analyses, Hone et al. (2024) recovered Skiphosoura as a non-pterodactyloid member of the Pterodactyliformes. Based on these results and many morphological features, they suggest that this taxon fills an important evolutionary gap between basal pterosaurs such as rhamphorhynchines and the later 'derived' pterodactyloids. These results are displayed in the cladogram below:

- Pterodactyliformes
  - 'Kunpengopterus' antipollicatus
  - - Wukongopteridae (Wukongopterus lii + IVPP V 17959)
    - - 'Darwinopterus' linglonglataensis
      - - IVPP V 23674 ('Kunpengopterus sinensis')
        - - Kunpengopterus sinensis (IVPP V 16047)
          - - Changchengopterus
            - - Skiphosoura
              - - Douzhanopterus
                - - "Rhamphodactylus"
                  - - Propterodactylus
                    - Pterodactyloidea
                      - Archaeopterodactyloidea
                      - - Azhdarchoidea
                        - Ornithocheiromorpha
