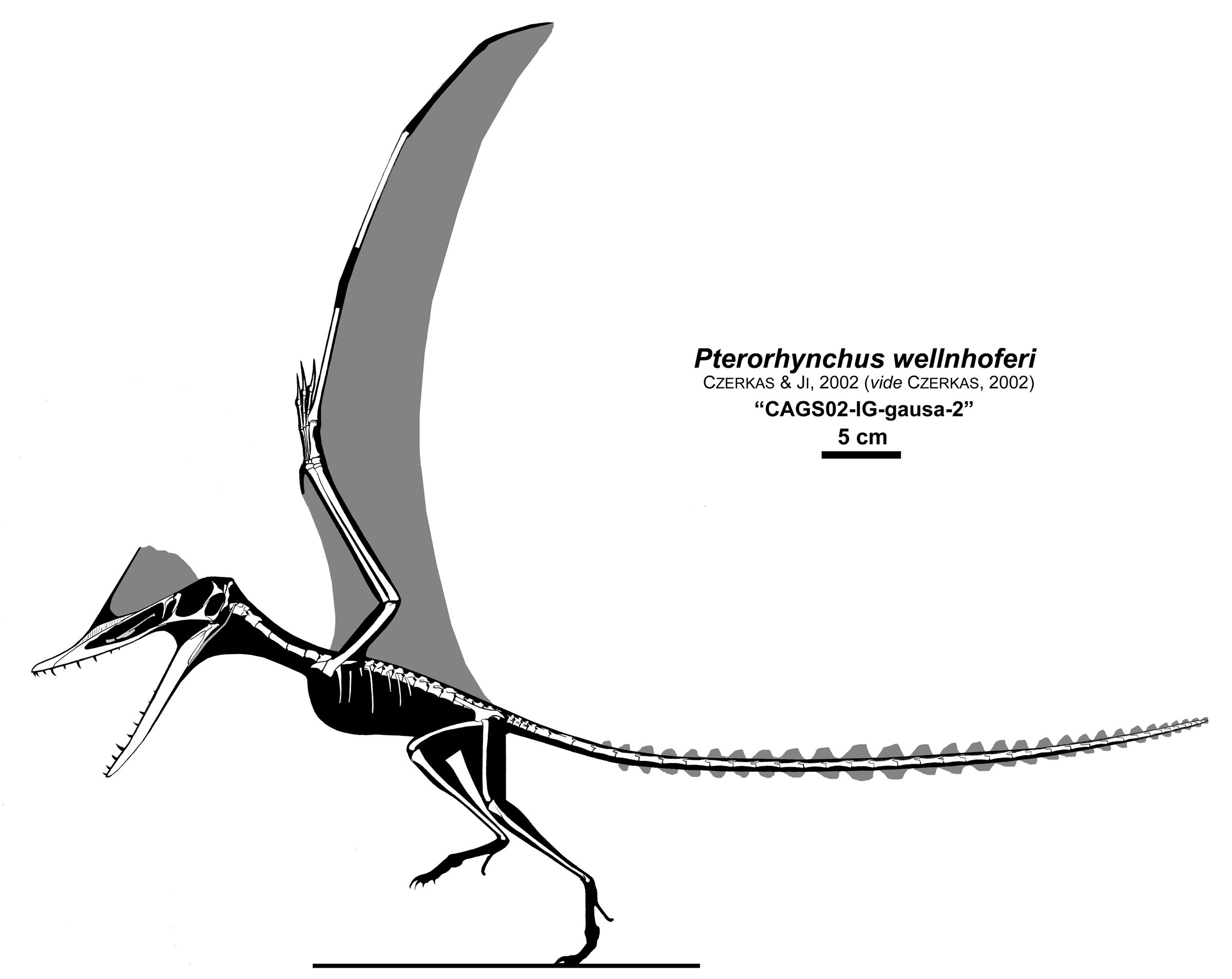
- Skeletal reconstruction showing known material

Scientific classification
- Kingdom: Animalia
- Phylum: Chordata
- Class: Reptilia
- Order: †Pterosauria
- Clade: †Darwinoptera
- Genus: †Pterorhynchus; Czerkas & Ji, 2002

Type species
- †Pterorhynchus wellnhoferi Czerkas & Ji, 2002

= Pterorhynchus =

Pterorhynchus Temporal range: Middle Jurassic, 164 Ma

Genus of darwinopteran pterosaur from the Middle Jurassic

Pterorhynchus ("wing snout") is an extinct genus of pterosaur from the mid-Jurassic aged Yanliao Biota of Inner Mongolia, China.

The genus was named in 2002 by Stephen Czerkas and Ji Qiang. The type species is Pterorhynchus wellnhoferi. The genus name is derived from Greek pteron, "wing" and rhynchos, "snout", in reference to the tall crest on the head. The specific name honours the German pterosaur researcher Peter Wellnhofer.

The genus is based on holotype CAGS02-IG-gausa-2/M 608 (earlier DM 608). It was found in Chifeng in the Daohugou Beds. According to Ji Pterorhynchus belongs to the Yanliao Biota from the Haifanggou Formation of the Callovian; Lü Junchang in 2007 ascribed it to the somewhat later Tiaojishan Formation of the same stage. In 2023, it is suggested that taxon is from Haifanggou Formation again.

== Description ==
The only known specimen had an elongated skull 11.8 centimetres (4.6 in) long, a long tail, and a wingspan of about 85 centimetres (33 in). This specimen consists of an articulated, nearly complete skeleton with remains of the integument. These included the wing membrane, hair-like structures, a long version of the vane found at the end of "rhamphorhynchoid" tails, and a head crest with both a low bony base and a large keratin extension; the latter feature is unusual in "rhamphorhynchoids" (i.e., basal pterosaurs), the fossils of which do not often show head crests. The front part of the extension continued the leading margin of the bone base, extending at quite a sharp angle; it finally curved back to the base of the skull in a rounded curve. The crest covered the posterior two thirds of the head, showed the presence of minute oval scales and was reinforced by a dozen ridges running parallel to the rounded trailing edge. At the base, a vertical pattern was visible, interpreted as corresponding to the original camouflage colour patterning. The describers ascribed a primarily aerodynamic function to the crest, which is reflected in the genus name.

Hair-like pycnofibers covered the body, and tiny tufts of fibers also covered portions of the wing membrane. These were described as pinnate, with many strands arising from a single base (similar to the calamus of the down feathers in birds), and seen as corresponding to the hypothetical Stage II in the evolution of feathers. This would suggest that pterosaur pycnofibres and dinosaur feathers were homologous. Later researchers—in a detailed study of pterosaur integument—recognized distinct tufts of fibers, but did not find evidence for the reported diamond-shaped patterns supposedly formed by these tufts when they examined the published photographs. However, they disagreed with the interpretation that the small nodules at the bases of some tufts were similar to a calamus, because they did not appear to be hollow.

== Classification ==
In their description of Pterorhynchus, Czerka and Ji assigned it to the Rhamphorhynchidae. In his 2006 book The Pterosaurs: From Deep Time, David Unwin regarded it as a Cretaceous genus, but this was based on old information. He also suggested that it was a scaphognathine, related to Scaphognathus. A large phylogenetic analysis performed by Brian Andres and colleagues in 2014 found that Pterorhynchus was actually a close relative of the similar-looking wukongopterids, and therefore a closer relative of pterodactyloid pterosaurs. Andres and colleagues assigned both the wukongopterids and Pterorhynchus to the group Darwinoptera.

== See also ==
- List of pterosaur genera
- Timeline of pterosaur research
