= List of pterosaur genera =

This list of pterosaurs is a comprehensive listing of all genera that have ever been included in the order Pterosauria, excluding purely vernacular terms. The list includes all commonly accepted genera, but also genera that are now considered invalid, doubtful (nomen dubium), or were not formally published (nomen nudum), as well as junior synonyms of more established names, and genera that are no longer considered pterosaurian. The list currently includes 289 genera.

== Scope and terminology ==
There is no official, canonical list of pterosaur genera, but the most thorough attempts can be found at the Pterosauria section of Mikko Haaramo's Phylogeny Archive, the Genus Index at Mike Hanson's The Pterosauria, supplemented by the Pterosaur Species List, and in the fourth supplement of Donald F. Glut's Dinosaurs: The Encyclopedia series.

=== Authors and year ===
The authors column lists the authors of the formal description responsible for the erection of the genus listed. They are not necessarily the same as the authors of the type species as sometimes a species from one genus is determined sufficiently distinct to warrant the erection of a new genus to house it. If this is the case, only the latter authors will be listed. The year column notes the year the description was published.

=== Status ===
Naming conventions and terminology follow the International Code of Zoological Nomenclature. Technical terms used include:

- Junior synonym: A name which describes the same taxon as a previously published name. If two or more genera are formally designated and the type specimens are later assigned to the same genus, the first to be published (in chronological order) is the senior synonym, and all other instances are junior synonyms. Senior synonyms are generally used, except by special decision of the ICZN, but junior synonyms cannot be used again, even if deprecated. Junior synonymy is often subjective, unless the genera described were both based on the same type specimen.
- Nomen nudum (Latin for "naked name"): A name that has appeared in print but has not yet been formally published by the standards of the ICZN. Nomina nuda (the plural form) are invalid, and are therefore not italicized as a proper generic name would be. If the name is later formally published, that name is no longer a nomen nudum and will be italicized on this list. Often, the formally published name will differ from any nomina nuda that describe the same specimen.
- Preoccupied name: A name that is formally published, but which has already been used for another taxon. This second use is invalid (as are all subsequent uses) and the name must be replaced. As preoccupied names are not valid generic names, they will also go unitalicized on this list.
- Nomen dubium (Latin for "dubious name"): A name describing a fossil with no unique diagnostic features. As this can be an extremely subjective and controversial designation, this term is not used on this list.

=== Age ===
The age column denotes the epoch of geologic time to which the fossils date. Genera that are invalid, misidentified, or otherwise do not represent a valid pterosaur are listed as age N/A because there was never a time in which a pterosaur by that generic name actually lived.

=== Location and notes ===
The location column designates the countries where remains of the relevant genus have been found. Genera that are invalid, misidentified, or otherwise do not represent a valid pterosaur are listed as location N/A because there was never a place in which a pterosaur by that generic name actually lived. The notes column is a collection of annotations on the scientific significance and taxonomic history of listed genera, as well as elaborations on the information presented in other columns.

== The list ==
=== Genera ===
Genus	Authors	Year	Status	Age	Location	Notes	Images
Aerodactylus	Vidovic & Martill	2014	Disputed	Late Jurassic	Germany	Some researchers suggest that every referred specimen is indistinguishable from Pterodactylus	
Aerodraco	Holgado & Pêgas	2020	Valid	Early Cretaceous to Late Cretaceous	United Kingdom (England)	Originally mistakenly thought to be a species of Pterodactylus	
Aerotitan	Novas et al.	2012	Valid	Late Cretaceous	Argentina	The first azhdarchid known from South America	
Aetodactylus	Myers	2010	Valid	Late Cretaceous	United States	Known from a partial lower jaw missing only two teeth	
Afrotapejara	Martill et al.	2020	Valid	Late Cretaceous	Morocco	The first African tapejarid and the fourth pterosaur validly named from the Kem Kem Group	
Aidachar	Nesov	1981	Misidentification	N/A	N/A	Actually a teleost fish whose remains were originally mistaken for jaw fragments of a ctenochasmatid pterosaur. The mistake was corrected five years later	
Akharhynchus	Jacobs, Smith & Zouhri	2024	Valid	Early Cretaceous? to Late Cretaceous	Morocco	Based only on fragmentary premaxillae	
Alamodactylus	Andres & Myers	2013	Valid	Late Cretaceous	United States	The holotype left wing is badly crushed	
Alanqa	Ibrahim et al.	2010	Valid	Late Cretaceous	Morocco	Characterized by straight, pointed jaws, not unlike those of some azhdarchids	
Albadraco	Solomon et al.	2020	Valid	Late Cretaceous	Romania	Has been suggested to represent a young Hatzegopteryx, but this was considered unlikely	
Alcione	Longrich et al.	2018	Valid	Late Cretaceous	Morocco	Possessed proportionately short wings, which imply an adaptation either for a rapid flapping or to aid with underwater movement	
Allkaruen	Codorniú et al.	2016	Valid	Early Jurassic	Argentina	Its braincase shows a number of features intermediate between earlier-diverging pterosaurs and more derived pterodactyloid taxa	
Altmuehlopterus	Vidovic & Martill	2017	Valid	Late Jurassic	Germany	Formerly assigned to Germanodactylus	
Amblydectes	Hooley	1914	Valid	Late Cretaceous	United Kingdom (England)	Has been synonymized with four other genera throughout history	
Angustinaripterus	He et al.	1983	Valid	Middle Jurassic	China	May be piscivorous on account of its dentition	
Anhanguera	Campos & Kellner	1985	Valid	Early Cretaceous to Late Cretaceous	Brazil; Morocco	A 2003 study shows that it, alongside many other pterosaurs, held its head while facing the ground	
Anurognathus	Döderlein	1923	Valid	Late Jurassic	Germany	Noted for its relatively short skull with pin-like teeth adapted for catching insects	
Apatomerus	Williston	1903	Misidentification	N/A	N/A	Probably a misidentified plesiosaur	
Apatorhamphus	McPhee et al.	2020	Valid	Late Cretaceous	Morocco	Possibly a chaoyangopterid although this cannot be confirmed due to the fragmentary nature of the remains	
Aralazhdarcho	Averianov	2007	Valid	Late Cretaceous	Kazakhstan	May be the sister taxon to Phosphatodraco	
Arambourgiania	Nessov	1989	Valid	Late Cretaceous	Jordan; Morocco? United States?	Had very long cervical vertebrae, making its neck longer than that of a modern giraffe	
Araripedactylus	Wellnhofer	1977	Dubious?	Early Cretaceous	Brazil	Has been suggested to be a nomen dubium due to the very fragmentary holotype and its supposed distinguishing traits being widespread among the Pterodactyloidea	
Araripesaurus	Price	1971	Dubious?	Early Cretaceous	Brazil	The first pterosaur known from Brazil	
Archaeoistiodactylus	Lü & Fucha	2010	Valid	Middle Jurassic	China	Had quite short metacarpals	
Arcticodactylus	Kellner	2015	Valid	Late Triassic	Greenland	Initially named as a species of Eudimorphodon, but it is distinct enough to be recognized as its own genus	
Ardeadactylus	Bennett	2013	Valid	Late Jurassic	Germany	Possessed larger teeth than the contemporary Pterodactylus, suggesting it would have possibly preyed on larger fish	
Argentinadraco	Kellner & Calvo	2017	Valid	Late Cretaceous	Argentina	Unusually, the top surface of the lower jaw consisted of ridges and depressions	
Arthurdactylus	Frey & Martill	1994	Valid	Early Cretaceous	Brazil	Named after Arthur Conan Doyle, author of the 1912 novel The Lost World	
Aurorazhdarcho	Frey, Meyer & Tischlinger	2011	Disputed	Late Jurassic	Germany	A 2025 analysis has suggested it may actually be a synonym of Gnathosaurus	
Aussiedraco	Kellner, Rodrigues & Costa	2011	Valid	Early Cretaceous	Australia	Known solely from a fragmentary dentary	
Austriadactylus	Dalla Vecchia et al.	2002	Valid	Late Triassic	Austria	Noted for a widened bony crest along the midline of the snout	
Austriadraco	Kellner	2015	Valid	Late Triassic	Austria	Its uniquely fused frontals were once misidentified as a breast bone	
Avgodectes	Peters	2004	Jr. synonym	N/A	N/A	Probable junior synonym of Haopterus	
Aymberedactylus	Pêgas et al.	2016	Valid	Early Cretaceous	Brazil	The holotype jaw has a mixture of primitive and derived traits among tapejarids	
Azhdarcho	Nesov	1984	Valid	Late Cretaceous	Kazakhstan; Tajikistan? Uzbekistan	This genus is the namesake of the Azhdarchidae and Azhdarchoidea	
Bakiribu	Pêgas et al.	2025	Dubious	Early Cretaceous	Brazil	Originally described as a ctenochasmatid pterosaur closely related to Pterodaustro, but may in fact be an amiid fish	
Bakonydraco	Ősi, Weishampel & Jianu	2005	Valid	Late Cretaceous	Hungary	Has been variously suggested to be an azhdarchid, a tapejarid, or an azhdarchoid outside those groups	
Balaenognathus	Martill et al.	2023	Valid	Late Jurassic	Germany	Was unable to fully close its mouth due to the upper jaw's strong curvature	
Banguela	Headden & Campos	2015	Valid	Early Cretaceous	Brazil	Described as an unusually edentulous dsungaripterid, later suggested to be a species of Thalassodromeus, and finally recovered as a valid taxon, potentially a chaoyangopterid	
Barbaridactylus	Longrich et al.	2018	Valid	Late Cretaceous	Morocco	Its femur has a slight distal expansion, a feature shared with Pteranodon	
Barbosania	Elgin & Frey	2011	Valid	Early Cretaceous	Brazil	Some remains initially referred to Brasileodactylus may in fact belong to this genus	
Batrachognathus	Ryabinin	1948	Valid	Late Jurassic	Kazakhstan	Possibly lived in a lacustrine habitat similar to that in the Solnhofen Limestone of Germany	
Beipiaopterus	Lü	2003	Valid	Early Cretaceous	China	Its wing membranes contained a large amount of blood vessels, suggesting they were possibly used in thermoregulation	
Bellubrunnus	Hone et al.	2012	Valid	Late Jurassic	Germany	Uniquely for a pterosaur, it had forward-curving wingtips	
Belonochasma	Broili	1939	Misidentification	N/A	N/A	Subsequently found to be a reptile of uncertain affinities	
Bennettazhia	Nessov	1991	Valid	Early Cretaceous	United States	Originally assigned to the unrelated Pteranodon	
Bergamodactylus	Kellner	2015	Jr. synonym	N/A	N/A	Junior synonym of Carniadactylus	
Bogolubovia	Nessov & Yarkov	1989	Valid	Late Cretaceous	Russia	Has been suggested to be likely synonymous with Volgadraco, but it was considered valid based on newly discovered remains	
Boreopterus	Lü & Ji	2005	Valid	Early Cretaceous	China	Probably used its needle-like teeth to trap small prey in a similar manner to Platanista river dolphins	
Brachytrachelus	Giebel	1850	Preoccupied	N/A	N/A	Preoccupied name, now known as Scaphognathus	
Brasileodactylus	Kellner	1984	Valid	Early Cretaceous	Brazil	One referred specimen indicates this genus had a thin crest in the lower jaw, contrasting the previous assumption that it had no crests in either jaw	
Cacibupteryx	Gasparini, Fernández & de la Fuente	2004	Valid	Late Jurassic	Cuba	Named based on a three-dimensionally preserved skull	
Caelestiventus	Britt et al.	2018	Valid	Late Triassic	United States	One of the largest pterosaurs known from the Triassic	
Caiuajara	Manzig et al.	2014	Valid	Early Cretaceous	Brazil	Known from exceptionally large concentrations of fossils, implying a gregarious behavior for this taxon	
Camposipterus	Rodrigues & Kellner	2013	Valid	Early Cretaceous	United Kingdom (England)	The tip of the snout was flat	
Campylognathoides	Strand	1928	Valid	Early Jurassic	Germany; India?	May have fed on cephalopods as indicated by the presence of Clarkeiteuthis remains among gut contents	
Campylognathus	Plieninger	1894	Preoccupied	N/A	N/A	Preoccupied name, now known as Campylognathoides	
Carniadactylus	Dalla Vecchia	2009	Valid	Late Triassic	Italy	Similar to Eudimorphodon, but differences in the size and dentition suggest distinct ecological roles for both taxa	
Cascocauda	Yang et al.	2022	Valid	Middle Jurassic to Late Jurassic	China	Some of the preserved pycnofibres resemble the feathers of maniraptoran dinosaurs, which suggests a close relationship between these integuments	
Cathayopterus	Wang & Zhou	2006	Valid	Early Cretaceous	China	The left side of the only described skull is damaged	
Caulkicephalus	Steel et al.	2005	Valid	Early Cretaceous	United Kingdom (England)	Likely had a backward-facing head crest when alive	
Caupedactylus	Kellner	2013	Valid	Early Cretaceous	Brazil	May have been relatively large for a tapejarid	
Caviramus	Fröbisch & Fröbisch	2006	Valid	Late Triassic	Switzerland	Its discovery suggests a greater diversity of Triassic pterosaurs than previously thought	
Cearadactylus	Leonardi & Borgomanero	1985	Jr. synonym	N/A	N/A	Junior synonym of Brasileodactylus	
Ceoptera	Martin-Silverstone et al.	2024	Valid	Middle Jurassic	United Kingdom (Scotland)	May have inhabited a low-salinity lagoon environment	
Changchengopterus	Lü	2009	Valid	Middle Jurassic	China	Two specimens are known, each belonging to different ontogenetic stages	
Chaoyangopterus	Wang & Zhou	2003	Valid	Early Cretaceous	China	Originally mistakenly believed to be a nyctosaurid	
Cimoliopterus	Rodrigues & Kellner	2013	Valid	Late Cretaceous	United Kingdom (England); United States	Would have been capable of long-distance oceanic soaring due to its remains being mostly found in marine strata	
Cimoliornis	Owen	1846	Valid	Late Cretaceous	United Kingdom (England)	Originally believed to be a giant albatross-like bird	
Coloborhynchus	Owen	1874	Valid	Early Cretaceous	United Kingdom (England)	Has had a very convoluted taxonomic history	
Comodactylus	Galton	1981	Dubious	Late Jurassic	United States	The first non-pterodactyloid pterosaur named from North America. Only a metacarpal is known	
Cratonopterus	Jiang et al.	2023	Valid	Early Cretaceous	China	Exhibits traits unique among ctenochasmatids	
Cretornis	Frič	1881	Valid	Late Cretaceous	Czech Republic	Uniquely, the distal part of its humerus is diamond-shaped in cross-section	
Criorhynchus	Owen	1874	Jr. synonym	N/A	N/A	Junior synonym of Ornithocheirus	
Cryodrakon	Hone et al.	2019	Valid	Late Cretaceous	Canada	The northernmost pterosaur named from North America	
Ctenochasma	Meyer	1851	Valid	Late Jurassic	France; Germany	Mainly characterized by its jaws filled with numerous long, narrow teeth	
Cuspicephalus	Martill & Etches	2013	Valid	Late Jurassic	United Kingdom (England)	The largest known wukongopterid and the only one currently described from outside China	
Cycnorhamphus	Seeley	1870	Valid	Late Jurassic	France; Germany	The unusual anatomy of its jaws suggests it could grab shelled prey similarly to openbill storks	
"Daitingopterus"	Maisch et al.	2004	Nomen nudum	N/A	N/A	Now referred to Altmuehlopterus	
Daohugoupterus	Cheng et al.	2015	Valid	Middle Jurassic to Late Jurassic	China	The smallest pterosaur known from the Yanliao Biota	
Darwinopterus	Lü et al.	2010	Valid	Middle Jurassic	China	Exhibits features of both basal pterosaurs and pterodactyloids	
Dawndraco	Kellner	2010	Disputed	Late Cretaceous	United States	Possible junior synonym of either Geosternbergia or Pteranodon	
Dearc	Jagielska et al.	2022	Valid	Middle Jurassic	United Kingdom (Scotland)	Its discovery refutes the claim that pterosaurs did not reach larger body sizes until the appearance of the pterodactyloid forms of the Cretaceous	
Dendrorhynchoides	Ji, Ji & Padian	1999	Valid	Early Cretaceous	China	Once thought to have come from the Jurassic. One of the youngest confirmed anurognathids	
Dendrorhynchus	Ji & Ji	1998	Preoccupied	N/A	N/A	Preoccupied name, now known as Dendrorhynchoides	
Dermodactylus	Marsh	1881	Dubious	Late Jurassic	United States	Solely represented by a partial hand bone	
Dimorphodon	Owen	1859	Valid	Early Jurassic	United Kingdom (England)	Possessed two different types of teeth, hence its genus name	
Diopecephalus	Seeley	1871	Valid	Late Jurassic	Germany	Has been suggested to be a synonym of Pterodactylus	
Dolicorhamphus	Seeley	1885	Valid	Middle Jurassic	United Kingdom (England)	Once thought to have been a dubious taxon. Two species are known	
Domeykodactylus	Martill et al.	2000	Valid	Early Cretaceous	Chile	Combines features of both ctenochasmatids and dsungaripterids, but it was referred to as a member of the latter group	
Doratorhynchus	Seeley	1875	Nomen vanum	Late Jurassic to Early Cretaceous	United Kingdom (England)	Poorly known	
Dorygnathus	Wagner	1860	Valid	Early Jurassic	France; Germany	Had been erroneously suggested to be capable of bipedal movement	
Douzhanopterus	Wang et al.	2017	Valid	Late Jurassic	China	Phylogenetically placed between the Wukongopteridae and Propterodactylus	
Draigwenia	Holgado	2021	Valid	Early Cretaceous	United Kingdom (England)	First described as a species of Ornithocheirus, but it is notably different from that taxon	
Dsungaripterus	Young	1964	Valid	Early Cretaceous	China; South Korea?	Had flat teeth located at the back of the jaws, indicating an adaptation for a durophagous diet	
Elanodactylus	Andres & Ji	2008	Valid	Early Cretaceous	China	Its cervicals were convergently similar to those of azhdarchids	
Eoazhdarcho	Lü & Ji	2005	Valid	Early Cretaceous	China	First described as an azhdarchid, though it has been found to be distantly related	
Eopteranodon	Lü & Zhang	2005	Valid	Early Cretaceous	China	Potentially related to the coeval Sinopterus	
Eosipterus	Ji & Ji	1997	Valid	Early Cretaceous	China	May have had bulky, elongated wings	
Eotephradactylus	Kligman et al.	2025	Valid	Late Triassic	United States	The oldest pterosaur from North America	
Epapatelo	Fernandes et al.	2022	Valid	Late Cretaceous	Angola	Known from incomplete, three-dimensionally preserved left limb bones belonging to two individuals	
Eudimorphodon	Zambelli	1973	Valid	Late Triassic	Italy	Several specimens previously attributed to this genus were later assigned to new taxa	
Eurazhdarcho	Vremir et al.	2013	Valid	Late Cretaceous	Romania	Distinguished by some features of its cervical vertebrae	
Eurolimnornis	Kessler & Jurcsák	1986	Dubious	Early Cretaceous	Romania	Originally described as a bird, but it was subsequently reinterpreted as a pterosaur	
Europejara	Vullo et al.	2012	Valid	Early Cretaceous	Spain	The first tapejarid officially named from Europe	
Faxinalipterus	Bonaparte et al.	2010	Misidentification	N/A	N/A	Although described as a pterosaur, it has since been reinterpreted as a non-pterosaurian archosaur, likely a lagerpetid	
Feilongus	Wang et al.	2005	Valid	Early Cretaceous	China	Had a uniquely pronounced overbite. One of the largest basal pterodactyloids	
Fenghuangopterus	Lü, Fucha & Chen	2010	Valid	Middle Jurassic	China	Only known from a fairly complete, although crushed, skeleton	
Ferrodraco	Pentland et al.	2019	Valid	Late Cretaceous	Australia	Discovered by a cattle farmer while spraying herbicide	
Forfexopterus	Jiang et al.	2016	Valid	Early Cretaceous	China	Unlike other ctenochasmatids, the tip of its snout was not spatula-shaped and possessed more curved teeth	
Galgadraco	Giaretta et al.	2025	Valid	Late Cretaceous	Brazil	Related to Albadraco from Europe	
Gallodactylus	Fabre	1974	Jr. synonym	N/A	N/A	Junior synonym of Cycnorhamphus	
Garudapterus	Manitkoon et al.	2025	Valid	Early Cretaceous	Thailand	The first pterosaur named from Southeast Asia and the youngest confirmed gnathosaurine known to date	
Gegepterus	Wang et al.	2007	Valid	Early Cretaceous	China	Had been speculated to be a juvenile of another ctenochasmatid	
Geosternbergia	Miller	1978	Jr. synonym	N/A	N/A	Junior synonym of Pteranodon, specifically P. sternbergi	
Germanodactylus	Yang	1964	Valid	Late Jurassic	Germany	The first pterosaur from which crest soft-tissue remains are known	
Gladocephaloideus	Lü	2012	Valid	Early Cretaceous	China	The type specimen was originally believed to be an adult, but the discovery of the second fossil indicates it is actually much younger	
Gnathosaurus	Meyer	1833	Valid	Late Jurassic	Germany; United Kingdom (England)	Originally mistakenly believed to be a marine crocodylomorph	
Gobiazhdarcho	Pêgas, Zhou & Kobayashi	2025	Valid	Late Cretaceous	Mongolia	One of the few pterosaurs described from Mongolia	
Guidraco	Wang et al.	2012	Valid	Early Cretaceous	China	May have possessed a head crest with a slight front curve in life as suggested by the angled skull roof	
Gwawinapterus	Arbour & Currie	2011	Misidentification	N/A	N/A	Initially thought to be a late-surviving istiodactylid pterosaur, but it was found to actually represent an indeterminate saurodontid fish the following year	
Haliskia	Pentland et al.	2024	Valid	Early Cretaceous	Australia	The most completely known Australian pterosaur so far	
Hamipterus	Wang et al.	2014	Valid	Early Cretaceous	China	Two different body and crest sizes are known, which may be a sexually dimorphic trait. Some well-preserved eggs are also known	
Haopterus	Wang & Lü	2001	Valid	Early Cretaceous	China	The first Chinese pterosaur from which a skull is known	
Harpactognathus	Carpenter et al.	2003	Valid	Late Jurassic	United States	Unusually for a rhamphorhynchid, it had a premaxillary crest on the midline of its skull that may have been expanded by soft tissue	
Hatzegopteryx	Buffetaut et al.	2002	Valid	Late Cretaceous	Romania	Large and very robust in morphology	
Herbstosaurus	Casamiquela	1975	Valid	Late Jurassic	Argentina	Erroneously described as a dinosaur until its reclassification as a pterosaur	
Hintighernia	Pêgas et al.	2026	Valid	Early Cretaceous	United Kingdom (England)	Based on a skull originally referred to Ornithostoma	
Hongshanopterus	Wang et al.	2008	Valid	Early Cretaceous	China	Initially placed within the Istiodactylidae by its describers, but it was later suggested to be in fact outside that family	
Huanhepterus	Dong	1982	Valid	Early Cretaceous	China	The right half of its skeleton was destroyed by an explosion in a quarry	
Huaxiadraco	Pêgas et al.	2023	Valid	Early Cretaceous	China	The third tapejarid known from the Jehol Biota. Originally referred to Huaxiapterus, which is now deemed synonymous with Sinopterus	
Huaxiapterus	Lü & Yuan	2005	Jr. synonym	N/A	N/A	Junior synonym of Sinopterus	
Iberodactylus	Holgado et al.	2019	Valid	Early Cretaceous	Spain	Possibly the largest pterosaur identified from the Iberian Peninsula	
Ikrandraco	Wang et al.	2020	Valid	Early Cretaceous	China; United Kingdom (England)	Uniquely, its skull possessed a crest only in the lower jaw, hypothesized to have been an attachment point for a pelican-like gular pouch	
Inabtanin	Rosenbach et al.	2024	Valid	Late Cretaceous	Jordan	The structure of its bones implies a capability of flapping its wings during flight in contrast to the soaring deduced for the much larger contemporary Arambourgiania	
Infernodrakon	Thomas et al.	2025	Valid	Late Cretaceous	United States	Known from a single neck vertebra once believed to belong to Quetzalcoatlus	
Ingridia	Unwin & Martill	2007	Jr. synonym	N/A	N/A	Objective junior synonym of Tupandactylus	
Istiodactylus	Howse, Milner & Martill	2001	Valid	Early Cretaceous	China? United Kingdom (England)	Had a short, broad skull with exceptionally large naso-antorbital fenestrae	
Javelinadactylus	Campos	2021	Jr. synonym	N/A	N/A	Junior synonym of Wellnhopterus. Although named a few months earlier, its description was retracted over allegations that the describer did not have access to its holotype	
Jeholopterus	Wang et al.	2002	Valid	Middle Jurassic to Late Jurassic	China; North Korea?	Its large size potentially suggests it may have fed on fish other than insects as in other anurognathids	
Jianchangnathus	Cheng et al.	2012	Valid	Middle Jurassic	China	Shared various features with Scaphognathus	
Jianchangopterus	Lü & Bo	2011	Valid	Middle Jurassic	China	An almost complete skeleton is known, including the skull	
Jidapterus	Dong, Sun & Wu	2003	Valid	Early Cretaceous	China	Possessed very small eye sockets	
Kariridraco	Cerqueira et al.	2021	Valid	Early Cretaceous	Brazil	The type and only known skull was falsified by workers who glued it to the snout of an unrelated pterosaur	
Kepodactylus	Harris & Carpenter	1996	Valid	Late Jurassic	United States	Discovered alongside the remains of Stegosaurus	
Keresdrakon	Kellner et al.	2019	Valid	Early Cretaceous	Brazil	Found in direct association with the remains of Caiuajara, indicating the first known evidence for sympatry between pterosaurs	
Klobiodon	O'Sullivan & Martill	2018	Valid	Middle Jurassic	United Kingdom (England)	Its lower jaw had a gradual down curve at the front	
Kryptodrakon	Andres, Clark & Xu	2014	Valid	Middle Jurassic to Late Jurassic	China	The oldest pterodactyloid currently named	
Kunpengopterus	Wang et al.	2010	Valid	Middle Jurassic? to Late Jurassic	China	The species K. antipollicatus is noted for its opposable thumbs, an unusual trait among non-mammalian vertebrates	
Lacusovagus	Witton	2008	Valid	Early Cretaceous	Brazil	The largest pterosaur of the Crato Formation. May be a chaoyangopterid	
Laopteryx	Marsh	1881	Dubious	Late Jurassic	United States	Initially mistaken for a bird	
Laueropterus	Hone	2026	Valid	Late Jurassic	Germany	Likely a close relative of the coeval Makrodactylus and Skiphosoura	
Leptostomia	Smith et al.	2021	Valid	Early Cretaceous? to Late Cretaceous	Morocco	Potentially a probe-feeder as suggested by the unusual anatomy of its beak and the environment it would have lived in	
Liaodactylus	Zhou et al.	2017	Valid	Late Jurassic	China	The oldest ctenochasmatid known to date. Had a shorter snout and fewer teeth than later members of that family	
Liaoningopterus	Wang & Zhou	2003	Valid	Early Cretaceous	China	The fourth tooth of its upper jaw was the largest among pterosaurs	
Liaoxipterus	Dong & Lü	2005	Valid	Early Cretaceous	China	Might have been an insectivore capable of protruding its tongue as indicated by the preserved hyoid	
Limnornis	Kessler & Jurcsák	1984	Preoccupied	N/A	N/A	Preoccupied name, later renamed Palaeocursornis	
Lingyuanopterus	Xu et al.	2022	Valid	Early Cretaceous	China	Some features of the skull are adaptations for a scavenging lifestyle	
Linlongopterus	Rodrigues et al.	2015	Valid	Early Cretaceous	China	Its dentition looked quite similar to that of Haopterus and Mimodactylus	
"Lithosteornis"	Gervais	1844	Nomen nudum	N/A	N/A	Referred to Ornithocheirus	
Lonchodectes	Hooley	1914	Valid	Late Cretaceous	United Kingdom (England)	Noted for its vertically compressed jaws containing short teeth	
Lonchodraco	Rodrigues & Kellner	2013	Valid	Early Cretaceous to Late Cretaceous	United Kingdom (England)	Remains originally assigned to Pterodactylus and Lonchodectes	
Lonchognathosaurus	Maisch, Matzke & Sun	2004	Valid	Early Cretaceous	China; Russia?	Distinguishable by its pointed jaws	
Longchengpterus	Wang et al.	2006	Valid	Early Cretaceous	China	The first istiodactylid known from China	
Luchibang	Hone et al.	2020	Valid	Early Cretaceous	China	Has been found to be chimeric, with the tip of the snout being the actual holotype while the postcranial remains belong to an azhdarchomorph, probably Sinopterus	
Ludodactylus	Frey et al.	2003	Valid	Early Cretaceous	Brazil	Had a long crest at the back of the skull, convergent with adult male Pteranodon longiceps	
Luopterus	Hone	2020	Valid	Middle Jurassic to Late Jurassic	China	One of the smallest known pterosaurs. Originally believed to be a species of Dendrorhynchoides	
Lusognathus	Fernandes et al.	2023	Valid	Late Jurassic	Portugal	Its teeth were robust and rounded or oval in cross-section	
Maaradactylus	Bantim et al.	2014	Valid	Early Cretaceous	Brazil	Had one of the largest skulls of any anhanguerid	
Macrotrachelus	Giebel	1852	Jr. synonym	N/A	N/A	Junior synonym of Pterodactylus	
Makrodactylus	Hone et al.	2025	Valid	Late Jurassic	Germany	Smaller than most other known basal members of the Monofenestrata	
Meilifeilong	Wang et al.	2023	Valid	Early Cretaceous	China	The most well-preserved and complete member of the Chaoyangopteridae yet known	
Melkamter	Fernandes, Pol & Rauhut	2024	Valid	Early Jurassic	Argentina	The fifth pterosaur named from the Jurassic of South America	
Mesadactylus	Jensen & Padian	1989	Valid	Late Jurassic	United States	Its sacral vertebrae unusually shared one trait with birds, which led to its misidentification as one	
Microtuban	Elgin & Frey	2011	Valid	Late Cretaceous	Lebanon	Based on a juvenile specimen with many broken bones, which may have been caused by either a collision or an attack by a predator	
Mimodactylus	Kellner et al.	2019	Valid	Late Cretaceous	Lebanon	Represents the first completely known Afro-Arabian pterosaur fossil. Had conical teeth at the front of its jaws	
Mistralazhdarcho	Vullo et al.	2018	Valid	Late Cretaceous	France	Closely related to the South American Aerotitan	
Moganopterus	Lü et al.	2012	Valid	Early Cretaceous	China	Known for having the longest skull of any toothed pterosaur	
Montanazhdarcho	Padian, de Ricqlès & Horner	1995	Valid	Late Cretaceous	United States	Based on a mostly uncompressed fossil that may have belonged to a mature individual	
Muzquizopteryx	Frey et al.	2006	Valid	Late Cretaceous	Mexico	The holotype fossil had been used as a decoration of an office wall	
Mythunga	Molnar & Thulborn	2008	Dubious?	Early Cretaceous	Australia	Has been regarded as an indeterminate tropeognathine	
Navajodactylus	Sullivan & Fowler	2011	Valid	Late Cretaceous	United States	Tentatively attributed to the Azhdarchidae by its authors, but the lack of pneumacity in its forelimbs does not support this	
Nemicolopterus	Wang et al.	2008	Dubious	Early Cretaceous	China	Described as the smallest adult pterosaur yet recorded, but it has been recently suggested to represent an early development stage of Sinopterus	
Nesodactylus	Colbert	1969	Valid	Late Jurassic	Cuba	The first pterosaur discovered in Cuba. Similar to Rhamphorhynchus albeit with longer wings and bulkier limbs	
Nesodon	Jensen & Ostrom	1977	Lapsus calami	N/A	N/A	Misspelling of Nesodactylus, also preoccupied by a toxodont	
Nicorhynchus	Holgado & Pêgas	2020	Valid?	Early Cretaceous to Late Cretaceous	Morocco; United Kingdom (England)	A 2023 review claims both assigned species may be synonymous with Coloborhynchus, the genus to which they were initially attributed	
Ningchengopterus	Lü	2009	Valid	Early Cretaceous	China	Preserves soft tissue remains, including wing membranes and pycnofibres	
Nipponopterus	Zhou et al.	2025	Valid	Late Cretaceous	Japan	Similar in morphology to Gobiazhdarcho although it is also known from a subadult individual	
Noripterus	Young	1973	Valid	Early Cretaceous	China; Mongolia	Had a lightly built skull compared to its contemporary Dsungaripterus	
Normannognathus	Buffetaut, LePage & LePage	1998	Valid	Late Jurassic	France	Has been recovered in a variety of phylogenetic positions within the Monofenestrata	
Nurhachius	Wang et al.	2005	Valid	Early Cretaceous	China	Possibly paraphyletic as N. luei has been found to be closer to Hongshanopterus than to N. ignaciobritoi, the type species	
Nyctodactylus	Marsh	1881	Jr. synonym	N/A	N/A	Junior synonym of Nyctosaurus	
Nyctosaurus	Marsh	1876	Valid	Late Cretaceous	United States	Some individuals have been noted for their enormous, antler-like head crests	
Odontorhynchus	Stolley	1936	Jr. synonym	N/A	N/A	Junior synonym of Rhamphorhynchus	
"Oolithorhynchus"	Whalley	2000	Nomen nudum	N/A	N/A	A manuscript name about which almost nothing is known	
Ordosipterus	Ji	2020	Valid	Early Cretaceous	China	The morphology of its teeth may have made them not useful for cracking shells, unlike many other dsungaripterids	
Orientognathus	Lü et al.	2015	Valid	Middle Jurassic	China	One of the basalmost rhamphorhynchids currently known	
Ornithocephalus	Sömmering	1812	Jr. synonym	N/A	N/A	Junior synonym of Pterodactylus	
Ornithocheirus	Seeley	1869	Valid	Early Cretaceous to Late Cretaceous?	Morocco? United Kingdom (England)	Numerous species have been assigned to it in the past. However, most of these have been either deemed doubtful or moved to distinct genera	
Ornithodesmus	Seeley	1887	Misidentification	N/A	N/A	Later found to be a dromaeosaurid theropod dinosaur	
Ornithopterus	Meyer	1838	Jr. synonym	N/A	N/A	Junior synonym of Rhamphorhynchus	
Ornithostoma	Seeley	1871	Valid	Early Cretaceous	United Kingdom (England)	Once believed to be a senior synonym of Pteranodon	
"Osteornis"	Gervais	1844	Nomen nudum	N/A	N/A	Nomen ex dissertationae for pterosaur remains later named Palaeornis and Cimoliornis	
Otogopterus	Ji & Zhang	2020	Valid	Early Cretaceous	China	Probably lived near braided rivers	
Pachagnathus	Martínez et al.	2022	Valid	Late Triassic	Argentina	One of the only Triassic pterosaurs known from terrestrial environments	
Pachyrhamphus	Fitzinger	1843	Preoccupied	N/A	N/A	Preoccupied name, now known as Scaphognathus	
Palaeocursornis	Kessler & Jurcsák	1986	Dubious	Early Cretaceous	Romania	May be synonymous with Eurolimnornis	
Palaeornis	Mantell	1844	Preoccupied	N/A	N/A	Preoccupied name, now called Rexarthuria	
Pangupterus	Lü et al.	2016	Valid	Early Cretaceous	China	Its exact taxonomic placement is unknown	
Paranurognathus	Peters	2005	Jr. snyonym	N/A	N/A	Junior synonym of Anurognathus	
Parapsicephalus	Arthaber	1919	Valid	Early Jurassic	United Kingdom (England)	Its skull roof is convex, similar to that of dimorphodontians	
Peteinosaurus	Wild	1978	Valid	Late Triassic	Italy	One of the smallest and oldest pterosaurs	
Petrodactyle	Hone et al.	2023	Valid	Late Jurassic	Germany	Large for a Jurassic pterosaur	
Phobetor	Bakhurina	1986	Jr. snyonym	N/A	N/A	Junior synonym of Noripterus	
Phosphatodraco	Pereda-Suberbiola et al.	2003	Valid	Late Cretaceous	Morocco	One of the few azhdarchid pterosaurs known from a mostly complete neck	
Piksi	Varricchio	2002	Valid	Late Cretaceous	United States	Formerly erroneously described as a bird, although it was found to be a pterosaur by a later study	
Plataleorhynchus	Howse & Milner	1995	Valid	Late Jurassic to Early Cretaceous	United Kingdom (England)	Had a distinctive spoonbill-like beak with a rounded tip	
Prejanopterus	Vidarte & Calvo	2010	Valid	Early Cretaceous	Spain	Had a bent snout contrasting with the straight lower jaw	
Preondactylus	Wild	1984	Valid	Late Triassic	Italy	Was capable of developed flight despite having short wings	
"Pricesaurus"	Martins-Neto	1986	Nomen nudum	N/A	N/A	A synonym of Anhanguera	
Propterodactylus	Spindler	2024	Valid	Late Jurassic	Germany	Had been nicknamed the "Painten pro-pterodactyloid" before its formal description	
Ptenodactylus	Seeley	1869	Preoccupied	N/A	N/A	Preoccupied name, referred to multiple pterosaur taxa	
Ptenodracon	Lydekker	1888	Jr. synonym	N/A	N/A	Junior synonym of Pterodactylus	
Pteranodon	Marsh	1876	Valid	Late Cretaceous	United States	Multiple remains have been discovered, which make it one of the best known pterosaurs. Two species are known today, each with a different crest shape in adult males	
Ptéro-dactyle	Cuvier	1809	Invalid	N/A	N/A	Renamed Pterodactylus	
Pterodactylus	Cuvier	1809	Valid	Late Jurassic	Germany	The first valid pterosaur genus known to science	
Pterodaustro	Bonaparte	1970	Valid	Early Cretaceous	Argentina	Had bristle-like teeth in the lower jaws, an adaptation for filter-feeding	
Pterofiltrus	Jiang & Wang	2011	Valid	Early Cretaceous	China	Possessed a very elongated skull	
Pteromonodactylus	Teryaev	1967	Jr. synonym	N/A	N/A	Junior synonym of Rhamphorhynchus	
Pterorhynchus	Czerkas & Ji	2002	Valid	Middle Jurassic	China	Had both a low bony base and a large keratin extension forming its crest, a trait relatively unique among basal pterosaurs	
Pterotherium	Fischer	1813	Jr. synonym	N/A	N/A	Junior synonym of Pterodactylus	
Puntanipterus	Bonaparte & Sánchez	1975	Valid	Early Cretaceous	Argentina	Has been thought to be a probable junior synonym of Pterodaustro, but it was found to be in fact a valid dsungaripterid	
Qinglongopterus	Lü et al.	2012	Valid	Middle Jurassic to Late Jurassic	China	Mostly similar to Rhamphorhynchus but with shorter wings and a smaller skull	
Quetzalcoatlus	Lawson	1975	Valid	Late Cretaceous	United States	One of the largest and last known pterosaurs	
Radiodactylus	Andres & Myers	2013	Valid	Early Cretaceous	United States	May be the sister taxon to the Azhdarchidae	
Raeticodactylus	Stecher	2008	Valid	Late Triassic	Switzerland	Had been suggested to be a synonym of the contemporary Caviramus	
Rexarthuria	Thomas & McDavid	2026	Valid	Early Cretaceous	United Kingdom (England)	Formally described after years of complicated taxonomy	
Rhabdopelix	Cope	1870	Misidentification	N/A	N/A	At first thought to be a Triassic pterosaur, but it is now known to be, at least in part, a kuehneosaurid	
Rhamphinion	Padian	1984	Valid	Early Jurassic	United States	Fragmentary fossils discovered in the United Kingdom initially attributed to the taxon have been found to actually come from a rhamphorhynchid	
Rhamphocephalus	Seeley	1880	Misidentification	N/A	N/A	Later reassigned to the Thalattosuchia	
Rhamphorhynchus	Meyer	1846	Valid	Late Jurassic	Germany; Portugal? Spain? Tanzania? United Kingdom (England)	Known from many fossil specimens, some even preserving soft-tissue impressions	
Samrukia	Naish et al.	2012	Valid?	Late Cretaceous	Kazakhstan	Known only from a lower jaw once thought to belong to a bird. Possible synonym of Aralazhdarcho	
Santanadactylus	De Buisonjé	1980	Dubious?	Early Cretaceous	Brazil	Would have been very large. Four species were named although they have been considered unrelated to each other	
Saratovia	Averianov	2025	Valid	Late Cretaceous	Russia	One of the latest-surviving toothed pterosaurs	
Scaphognathus	Wagner	1861	Valid	Late Jurassic	Germany	May have had diurnal habits unlike some other contemporary pterosaurs, which are suggested to be nocturnal	
Seazzadactylus	Dalla Vecchia	2019	Valid	Late Triassic	Italy	Had an exclamation mark-shaped pteroid bone	
Sericipterus	Andres et al.	2010	Valid	Late Jurassic	China	A close relative of Angustinaripterus	
Serradraco	Rigal et al.	2018	Valid	Early Cretaceous	United Kingdom (England)	Described as a possible lonchodectid, but a later analysis has suggested it was not a member of that family	
Shenzhoupterus	Lü et al.	2008	Valid	Early Cretaceous	China	Can be distinguished by the arched head crest	
Simurghia	Longrich et al.	2018	Valid	Late Cretaceous	Brazil? Morocco	Similar to the contemporary Alcione, although it is not represented by an adult	
Sinomacrops	Wei et al.	2021	Valid	Middle Jurassic to Late Jurassic	China	Various bone tissue fragments have been lost as a result of their extremely fragile condition	
Sinopterus	Wang & Zhou	2003	Valid	Early Cretaceous	China	A specimen reported in 2025 had gastroliths and phytoliths preserved in its stomach cavity, indicating an evidence for a herbivorous diet	
Siroccopteryx	Mader & Kellner	1999	Valid?	Late Cretaceous	Morocco	Some researchers regard it as a probable junior synonym of Coloborhynchus	
Skiphosoura	Hone et al.	2024	Valid	Late Jurassic	Germany	Transitional between basal pterosaurs and later pterodactyloids	
Sordes	Sharov	1971	Valid	Late Jurassic	Kazakhstan	Its tail comprised over half of the total body length	
Spathagnathus	Fernandes et al.	2025	Valid	Late Jurassic	Germany	Unusually, its teeth were adapted for a diet of shelled prey items	
Sultanuvaisia	Nessov	1981	Misidentification	N/A	N/A	Has been found to be actually a fish	
Tacuadactylus	Soto et al.	2021	Valid	Late Jurassic	Uruguay	The holotype snout was formerly misidentified as belonging to a sawfish	
Tapejara	Kellner	1989	Valid	Early Cretaceous	Brazil	Possessed a semicircular crest above its snout and a bony projection at the back of the head	
Targaryendraco	Pêgas et al.	2019	Valid	Early Cretaceous	Germany	Originally named as a species of Ornithocheirus	
Tendaguripterus	Unwin & Heinrich	1999	Valid	Late Jurassic	Tanzania	Inconsistent in phylogenetic placement	
Tethydraco	Longrich et al.	2018	Valid	Late Cretaceous	Morocco	One study regarded it as an azhdarchid possibly synonymous with Phosphatodraco. However, this has been cast into doubt by subsequent research	
Thalassodromeus	Kellner & Campos	2002	Valid	Early Cretaceous	Brazil	At first believed to have fed like extant skimmers, but it was found to have possessed strong jaw muscles, suggesting a ground foraging lifestyle	
Thanatosdrakon	Ortiz David et al.	2022	Valid	Late Cretaceous	Argentina	May be the largest pterosaur of the Southern Hemisphere	
Thapunngaka	Richards et al.	2021	Valid	Early Cretaceous	Australia	Its lower jaw is very similar to that of Anhanguera piscator	
Titanopteryx	Arambourg	1959	Preoccupied	N/A	N/A	Preoccupied by a simuliid blackfly, later renamed Arambourgiania	
Torukjara	Pêgas	2024	Valid	Early Cretaceous	Brazil	Remains originally identified as Caiuajara	
Tribelesodon	Bassani	1886	Misidentification	N/A	N/A	Now known to be a misinterpreted specimen of the archosauromorph Tanystropheus	
Tropeognathus	Wellnhofer	1987	Valid	Early Cretaceous	Brazil	One of the largest South American pterosaurs, with some azhdarchids rivaling it in size	
Tsogtopteryx	Pêgas et al.	2025	Valid	Late Cretaceous	Mongolia	Small for an azhdarchid despite being fully grown	
Tupandactylus	Kellner & Campos	2007	Valid	Early Cretaceous	Brazil	One specimen of T. imperator preserves pigment cells similar to those found in birds, as well as likely Stage IIIa feathers	
Tupuxuara	Kellner & Campos	1988	Valid	Early Cretaceous	Brazil	Two valid species are known, eaching differing from each other in the crest morphology	
Tylodorhynchus	Pêgas & Holgado	2026	Valid	Early Cretaceous	United Kingdom (England)	Once named as a European species of Uktenadactylus	
Uktenadactylus	Rodrigues & Kellner	2009	Valid	Early Cretaceous	United States	Formerly referred to Coloborhynchus	
Unwindia	Martill	2011	Valid	Early Cretaceous	Brazil	Its snout was triangular in cross-section	
Utahdactylus	Czerkas & Mickelson	2002	Valid	Late Jurassic	United States	Once considered indeterminate within the Diapsida	
Vectidraco	Naish et al.	2013	Valid	Early Cretaceous	United Kingdom (England)	Its ilium was distinctively pneumatized	
Vesperopterylus	Lü et al.	2017	Valid	Early Cretaceous	China	Noted for having a reversed first toe, likely suggesting an arboreal lifestyle	
Volgadraco	Averianov et al.	2008	Valid	Late Cretaceous	Russia	Some studies have proposed a nyctosaurid, pteranodontid, or basal pteranodontoid placement for this genus. However, a 2026 review restricted the taxon to the type snout and recovered it in the Azhdarchidae, supporting its original description	
Wellnhopterus	Andres & Langston Jr.	2021	Valid	Late Cretaceous	United States	Would have hunted its prey in a raptorial manner as indicated by the blunt jaws and proportionally short neck	
Wenupteryx	Codorniú & Gasparini	2013	Valid	Late Jurassic	Argentina	Possibly allied to the archaeopterodactyloids	
Wightia	Martill et al.	2020	Valid	Early Cretaceous	United Kingdom (England)	Known from damaged partial premaxillae	
Wukongopterus	Wang et al.	2009	Valid	Middle Jurassic to Late Jurassic	China	The holotype may have broken its shin before its death	
"Wyomingopteryx"	Bakker	1994	Nomen nudum	N/A	N/A	Likely intended to be coined for a pterosaur specimen with similarities to Istiodactylus	
Xericeps	Martill et al.	2017	Valid	Late Cretaceous	Morocco	Possessed a unique forceps-like beak	
Yelaphomte	Martínez et al.	2022	Valid	Late Triassic	Argentina	Had a tall, narrow bony crest similar to that of Raeticodactylus and Austriadactylus	
Yixianopterus	Lü et al.	2006	Valid	Early Cretaceous	China	Known from a single, partially-preserved individual	
Zhejiangopterus	Cai & Wei	1994	Valid	Late Cretaceous	China	Four specimens have been described so far	
Zhenyuanopterus	Lü	2010	Valid	Early Cretaceous	China	Has been claimed to be the adult form of Boreopterus	

=== Ichnogenera ===
Genus	Authors	Year	Status	Age	Location	Notes	Images
Agadirichnus	Ambroggi & Lapparent	1954	Valid	Late Cretaceous	Morocco	The first pterosaur ichnogenus ever named	
Haenamichnus	Hwang et al.	2002	Valid	Late Cretaceous	South Korea	Likely made by azhdarchids	
Jinjuichnus	Jung et al.	2026	Valid	Early Cretaceous	South Korea	Preserved next to a trackway made by a small vertebrate, which indicates the trackmaker, probably a neoazhdarchian, was attempting to hunt the smaller animal	
Pteraichnus	Stokes	1957	Valid	Late Jurassic	Asia; Europe; North America	Some tracks attributed to this ichnogenus have been considered crocodilian in origin by some scientists. However, recent studies have overturned those thoughts	
Purbeckopus	Delair	1963	Dubious	Early Cretaceous	United Kingdom (England)	May have been made by a relatively large pterosaur	
Rhamphichnus	Mazin & Pouech	2020	Valid	Late Jurassic	Europe	Made by non-pterodactyloid pterosaurs	

=== Oogenera ===
Although pterosaur eggs are known, some with complete embryos, no oogenera have been erected to house them. The holotype of the oospecies Oolithes sphaericus was briefly considered by Harry Govier Seeley to be pterosaurian in origin, although this attribution was dismissed before the formal erection of that oogenus.

== See also ==
- List of dinosaurs
- List of plesiosaurs
- List of pterosaur classifications
- Pterosaur
- Timeline of pterosaur research
