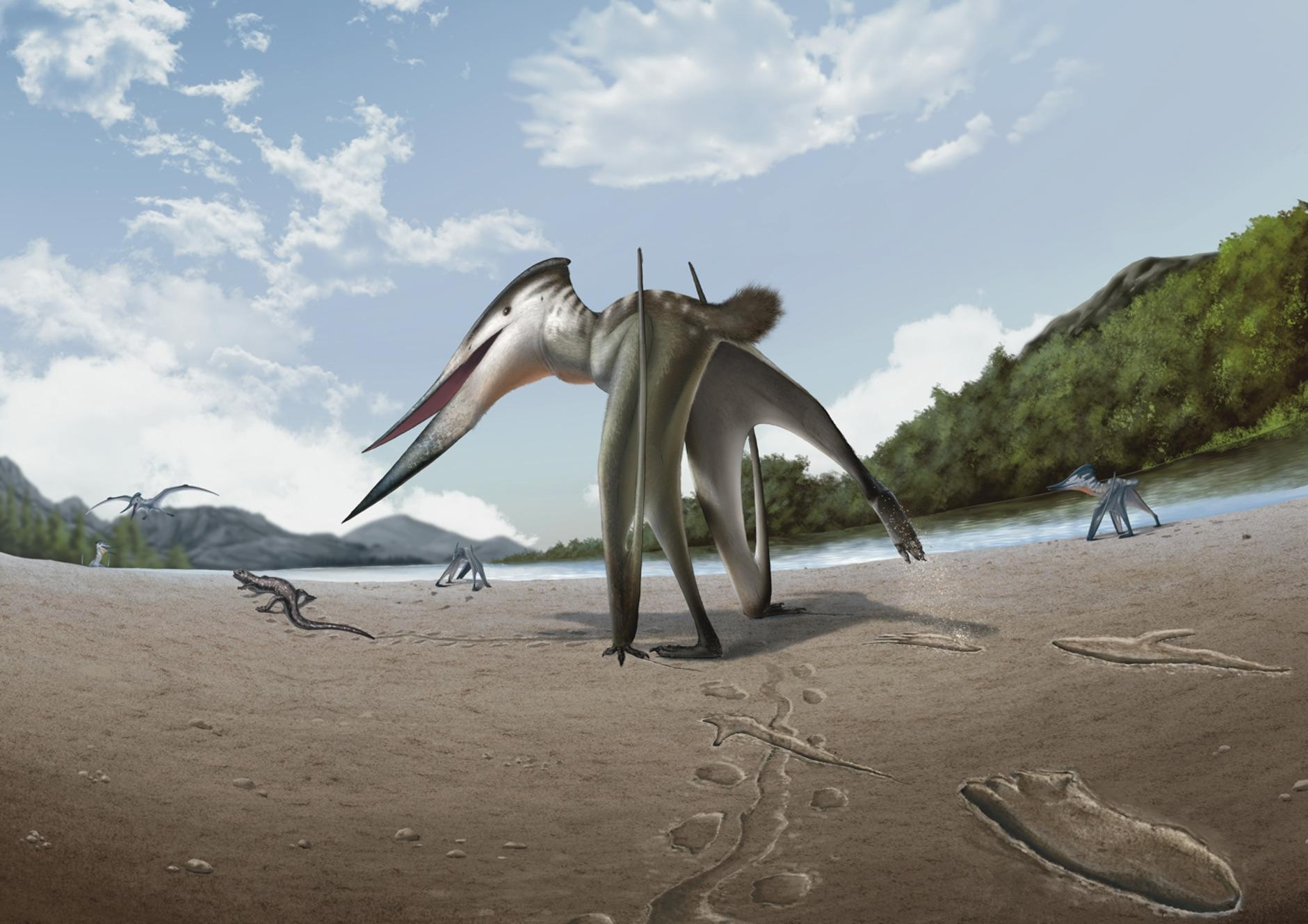
- Speculative life restoration of the J. procerus trackmaker pursuing a small vertebrate

Trace fossil classification
- Ichnofamily: Agadirichnidae
- Ichnogenus: Jinjuichnus; Jung et al., 2026

Type ichnospecies
- †Jinjuichnus procerus Jung et al., 2026

= Jinjuichnus =

Jinjuichnus Temporal range: Early Cretaceous (Albian), 106.5 Ma

Ichnogenus of pterosaur footprint

Jinjuichnus (lit. 'Jinju track') is an ichnogenus of pterosaur footprint classified in the ichnofamily Agadirichnidae. The ichnogenus contains a single ichnospecies, Jinjuichnus procerus, described in 2026 from prints found in the Lower Cretaceous (Albian age) Jinju Formation of South Korea. It is known from a single trackway preserved on a slab of sandstone, showing four tridactyl manus (three-digit hand) prints and three tetradactyl pes (four-digit foot) prints.

This trackway is preserved immediately next to the trackway of a small vertebrate, possibly a salamander or lizard. The tracks of the latter abruptly change direction and increase in stride length where they meet the tracks of the former, a potential indication that the pterosaur was preying on the smaller animal. Calculations based on the holotype trackway of J. procerus suggest the trackmaker was moving at a speed of around 0.8 metres per second (1.8 mph), which is relatively high compared to most pterosaur speeds estimated from other trackways.

J. procerus is characterized by being relatively large and having an elongated third digit, a blunt first digit, and a wide divarication angle between the first and third digits of the manus. The J. procerus trackmaker was likely a neoazhdarchian pterosaur, based on the observed slender shape of the manus, reduced pedal digit size in relation to the elongate metatarsals, and compact outline of the pes. Neoazhdarchians like chaoyangopterids have gently curved, reduced pedal unguals (toe claws), suggesting adaptations for terrestrial locomotion and a possible "stalking" foraging strategy.

== See also ==
- List of pterosaur genera#Ichnogenera
- Agadirichnus
- Haenamichnus
