= Purbeckopus =

Trace fossil classification
- Kingdom: Animalia
- Phylum: Chordata
- Order: †Pterosauria
- Suborder: †Pterodactyloidea
- Ichnofamily: †Pteraichnidae
- Ichnogenus: †Purbeckopus; Delair, 1963

Type ichnospecies
- †Purbeckopus pentadactylus Delair, 1963

Trace fossil

Purbeckopus is an ichnotaxon of pterosaur of the family Pteraichnidae. The trackmaker of Purbeckopus lived in southern England during the Berriasian, in the Early Cretaceous. According to the fossil remains found, it is expected that it was a large pterosaur, with 6 m (19.7 ft) in wingspan.

== See also ==
- Timeline of pterosaur research
- Ichnology
- List of pterosaur ichnogenera
