= Pterodactylus giganteus =

Pterodactylus giganteus is a scientific name which has been used for at least three distinct species of pterosaurs previously classified in the genus Pterodactylus. It may refer to:

- "Pterodactylus" giganteus (Oken, 1819): Originally Ornithocephalus giganteus, currently considered a synonym of Rhamphorhynchus muensteri
- "Pterodactylus" giganteus (Morris, 1854): A synonym of Cimoliornis diomedeus
- "Pterodactylus" giganteus (Bowerbank, 1846): Now Lonchodraco giganteus
