= Agadirichnus =

Agadirichnus Temporal range: Maastrichtian

Trace fossil classification
- Ichnogenus: †Agadirichnus; Ambroggi and Lapparent, 1954

Type ichnospecies
- †Agadirichnus elegans Ambroggi and Lapparent, 1954

Ichnogenus of probable azhdarchid pterosaurs

Agadirichnus is an ichnogenus of probable azhdarchid pterosaurs from the Late Cretaceous (Maastrichtian) of Morocco. The type and only ichnospecies is A. elegans, representing the first named trace fossil made by a pterosaur.

== Discovery ==
Agadirichnus, meaning 'trace of Agadir', was first described as lizard tracks in 1954 based on two pes prints discovered from the Maastrichtian Tagragra tracksite of Agadir, Morocco. Various paleontologists have since suggested different interpretations, but the type locality was unknown for a long time and the type specimen of this ichnotaxon was considered to be lost. In 2018, Masrour and colleagues designated a neotype (FSA.G.54) based on an isolated, virtually identical footprint they found on the rediscovered type locality, and reclassified this ichnogenus as that of a pterosaur, most likely an azhdarchid.

== Classification ==
While Agairnichnus was initially described as lizard tracks, other researchers have doubted this classification since 2003, when two opposing interpretations of this ichnotaxon was proposed: American paleontologists Martin Lockley and John R. Foster claimed that Agadirichnus represented mammal tracks, while French paleontologists Jean-Paul Billon-Bruyat and Jean-Michel Mazin suggested that it is a pterodactyloid pterosaurian ichnotaxon, possibly a senior synonym of Pteraichnus saltwashensis.

This would make Agadirichnus the first described pterosaur ichnofossil in the history of paleontology, though other researchers still noted its uncertainty due to the poor preservation of the type specimen, suggesting that this taxon might be a nomen dubium. In 2018, Masrour and colleagues rediscovered the type locality and found an isolated footprint, assigned as the neotype, which confirmed the validity and pterosaurian identity of this ichnotaxon. They also erected a new ichnofamily Agadirichnidae which contains both Agadirichnus and the azhdarchid ichnotaxon Haenamichnus from the Campanian Uhangri Formation of South Korea.
