= Belonochasma =

Belonochasma Temporal range: Mesozoic (possibly Jurassic)

Scientific classification
- Domain: Eukaryota
- Kingdom: Animalia
- Phylum: Chordata
- Class: Reptilia
- Order: incertae sedis
- Genus: †Belonochasma; Broili, 1939

Type species
- †Belonochasma aenigmaticum Broili, 1939

Extinct genus of jawed vertebrates

Belonochasma (meaning "needle mouth") is a genus of reptile from the Mesozoic (possibly Jurassic) of Franconia, Bavaria, Germany. The type species, B. aenigmaticum, was described in 1939. It was once thought to be a pterosaur, but this was rejected by Oskar Kuhn in 1961, and upheld by Peter Wellnhofer in 1978.

== See also ==
- List of pterosaur genera
- Timeline of pterosaur research
