= Utahdactylus =

Utahdactylus Temporal range: Late Jurassic

Scientific classification
- Domain: Eukaryota
- Kingdom: Animalia
- Phylum: Chordata
- Clade: Ornithodira
- Clade: †Pterosauromorpha
- Order: †Pterosauria
- Genus: †Utahdactylus; Czerkas and Mickelson, 2002
- Species: †U. kateae

Binomial name
- †Utahdactylus kateae Czerkas and Mickelson, 2002

Extinct genus of reptiles

Utahdactylus was a genus of extinct reptile from the Kimmeridgian-Tithonian-age Upper Jurassic Morrison Formation of Utah, United States. Based on DM 002/CEUM 32588 (an incomplete skeleton described as including a fragment of the skull, a cervical vertebra, three back vertebrae, and a caudal vertebra, ribs, a scapula, coracoid, and limb bones), Czerkas and Mickelson (2002) identified it as a "rhamphorhynchoid" pterosaur. Bennett (2007) later concluded that it has no diagnostic features of the Pterosauria, and cannot be positively identified beyond being an indeterminate diapsid. More recent work on newly prepared material, however, seems to confirm once again that Utahdactylus was a pterosaur.

== History ==
The genus was named and described in 2002 by Stephen Czerkas and Debra Mickelson. The type species is Utahdactylus kateae. The genus name is derived from Utah and Greek daktylos, "finger". The specific name means "for Kate", referring to Kate Mickelson.

The holotype consists of some disarticulated bone fragments preserved on several chalkstone blocks. It is housed in the Dinosaur Museum, run by Czerkas himself.

The specimen was first described as a pterosaur, with a long tail and an estimated wingspan of 1.20 meters (3.94 feet). The authors considered it to be a "rhamphorhynchoid", i.e. a basal pterosaur, due to its long tail and large but not elongate cervical vertebrae, but without the typical groove in its forelimb bones. It was regarded as a "rhamphorhynchoid" based on an unprepared specimen in the most recent review of Morrison pterosaurs.

In 2007, pterosaur specialist Chris Bennett published a redescription wherein he disagreed with Czerkas' and Mickelson's conclusions. He found several of the bone identifications and interpretations to be mistaken, such as the skull bone (interpreted here as just a bone fragment of unknown origin), elongate tail vertebra (the presumed elongated extensions were ribs), humerus (unknown), and the orientation of the bone described as a scapulacoracoid (the scapula and coracoid parts had been confused). He could not locate other bones seen as impressions, and found no evidence to suggest that the identifiable bones came from a pterosaur. In fact, he found the general quality of the bone texture to differ from that of pterosaur bones. He concluded by classifying it as Diapsida incertae sedis, and a dubious name, adding an exhortation not to name pterosaurs from material lacking unequivocal pterosaur characters.

Bennett's conclusion was rejected by Czerkas & Ford (2018), who affirmed the validity of initial interpretation of Utahdactylus as a pterosaur. The authors reported that the cervical of the holotype specimen was completely prepared out of the matrix along with the scapulacoracoid, a sacrum, and part of a mandible. The study of the glenoid indicated that it had a pterosaur saddle-shaped articulation for the humerus. In addition, the authors reported a parallel alignment of the dentaries, indicating that they formed a mandibular symphysis. Czerkas & Ford interpreted the presence of the elongate mandibular symphysis and spoon-like expansion of the anterior end of the jaws as aligning Utahdactylus with pterodactyloids, and specifically within Ctenochasmatidae. The authors interpreted Utahdactylus as the first known gnathosaur from North America.

== See also ==
- List of pterosaur genera
- Timeline of pterosaur research
