= 1846 in paleontology =

Paleontology or palaeontology is the study of prehistoric life forms on Earth through the examination of plant and animal fossils. This includes the study of body fossils, tracks (ichnites), burrows, cast-off parts, fossilised feces (coprolites), palynomorphs and chemical residues. Because humans have encountered fossils for millennia, paleontology has a long history both before and after becoming formalized as a science. This article records significant discoveries and events related to paleontology that occurred or were published in the year 1846.

== Pterosaurs ==
=== New taxa ===
Name	Status	Authors	Age	Unit	Location	Notes	Images
Cimoliornis	Nomen dubium	Owen	Middle Cretaceous (Turonian)	Unnamed unit in Chalk Group	UK	A dubious pterosaur.	
Rhamphorhynchus	Valid	von Meyer	Late Jurassic (Kimmeridgian-Tithonian)	Solnhofen Formation	Germany; Portugal; Tanzania; UK; Spain	A rhamphorhynchid pterosaur.	Rhamphorhynchus

== Sauropterygians ==
=== Newly named plesiosaurs ===
Name	Status	Authors	Age	Unit	Location	Notes	Images
Plesiosaurus megacephalus	Valid	Stutchbury	Early Jurassic (Hettangian-Sinemurian)	Blue Lias	UK	A rhomaleosaurid plesiosaur; type species of Atychodracon Smith, 2015.	
