= Rhamphinion =

Rhamphinion Temporal range: Early Jurassic, 196.5–183.0 Ma

Scientific classification
- Kingdom: Animalia
- Phylum: Chordata
- Class: Reptilia
- Order: †Pterosauria
- Clade: †Dimorphodontia (?)
- Genus: †Rhamphinion; Padian, 1984
- Species: †R. jenkinsi

Binomial name
- †Rhamphinion jenkinsi Padian, 1984

Genus of dimorphodontid pterosaur from the Early Jurassic

Rhamphinion (meaning "beak nape"; Greek rhamphos, "beak" is a common part of "rhamphorhynchoid" names, and the remains of this animal came from the rear of the skull, i.e. "nape" or inion) is a genus of pterosaurs from the Sinemurian-mid Pliensbachian-age Lower Jurassic Kayenta Formation of northeastern Arizona, United States. The type species is R. jenkinsi.

== Discovery and naming ==
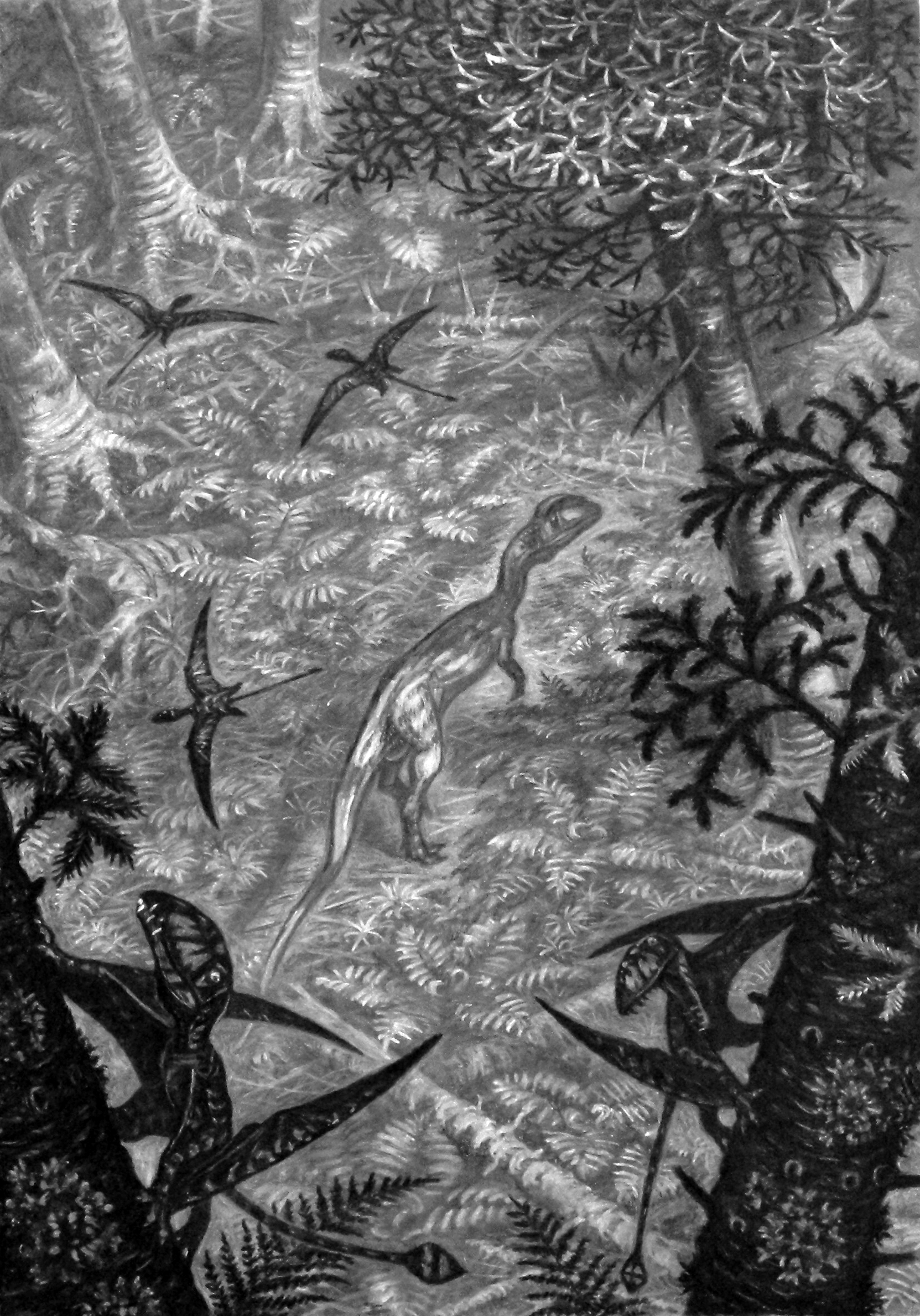
Life restoration of Rhamphinion with Dilophosaurus in the background

Fossils of Rhamphinion were first discovered in 1978 when an expedition conducted by the Museum of Comparative Zoology at Harvard University and the Museum of Northern Arizona led by Farish A. Jenkins Jr. collected several small pterosaur fossils from the sandstone deposits of the Kayenta Formation, dating to the Early Jurassic (188 mya -185 mya) in Coconino County, northern Arizona, USA. The fossils were collected from the lands of the Navajo Nation and are reposited at the Museum of Northern Arizona under catalog number MNA.V.4500. The fossils were fragmentary and all from one individual, consisting of two skull fragments (an occipital and partial jugal), a possible mandible fragment, and an unidentifiable bone impression. In 1981, James M. Clark of the University of Chicago collected a nearly complete fourth wing metacarpal of a pterosaur from the Kayenta Formation strata at the “Airhead West” locality nearby. This metacarpal was the first pterosaur bone found from the Kayenta Formation and may belong to Rhamphinion, but a lack of overlap prevents definitive assignment. Some fragmentary fossils from the Middle Jurassic Taynton Limestone of the United Kingdom were referred to Rhamphinion, but are instead from an indeterminate rhamphorynchid.

These fossils were described in 1984 by Kevin Padian, a professor from the University of California, who named a new genus and species of pterosaur, Rhamphinion jenkinsi, on the basis of MNA.V.4500. The genus name Rhamphinion is derived from the Greek root rhamphos meaning “beak”, which is used in the names of many other pterosaur genera, and inion meaning “nape of the neck” after the preserved occipital in the holotype (original) specimen. The species name jenkinsi is after the discoverer of the fossils, Farish Alston Jenkins Jr. At the time, it was the oldest known pterosaur specimen from the Western Hemisphere (now overtaken by Caelestiventus).

== Classification ==
The phylogenetic placement of Rhamphinion is tenuous due to changes in basal pterosaur phylogenetics and the fragmentary fossils it is known from, which give little direct information on its classification. Kevin Padian did not assign it to any family or suborder within Pterosauria, in his original description, but did note that the jugal was unlike that of pterodactyloids, and so may have belonged to a "rhamphorhynchoid", i.e. a basal pterosaur. Padian also noted the similarity of the fossils to Dimorphodon, a genus of Early Jurassic basal pterosaur from Britain. Peter Wellnhofer agreed that a "rhamphorhynchoid" identity was very likely, but David Unwin was more hesitant to classify its fragmentary remains in The Pterosaurs: From Deep Time, noting it only as a "possibly valid species of uncertain relationships."

== See also ==
- List of pterosaur genera
- Timeline of pterosaur research
