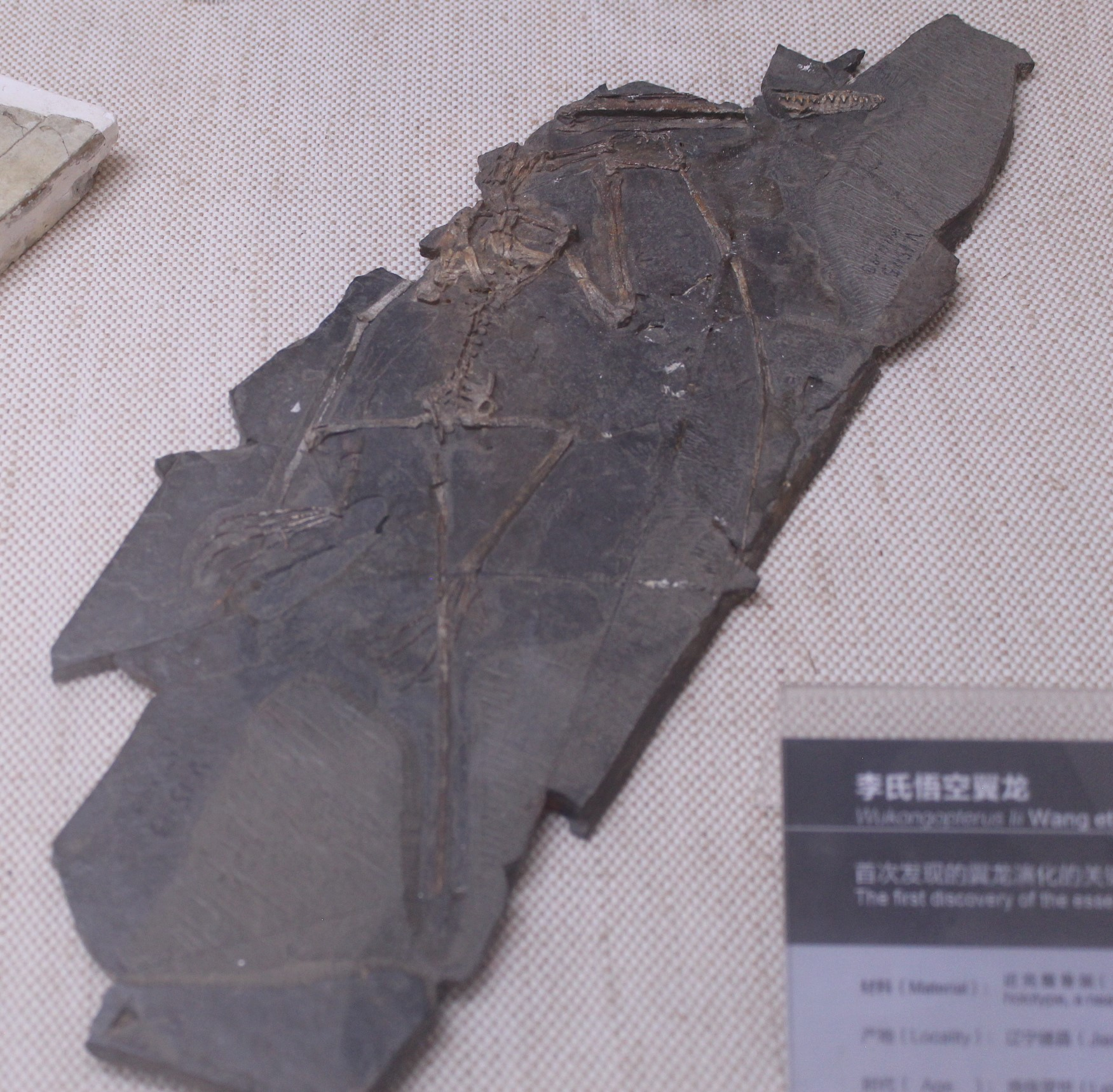
- Holotype, Paleozoological Museum of China

Scientific classification
- Kingdom: Animalia
- Phylum: Chordata
- Class: Reptilia
- Order: †Pterosauria
- Family: †Wukongopteridae
- Subfamily: †Wukongopterinae
- Genus: †Wukongopterus; Wang et al., 2009
- Species: †W. lii

Binomial name
- †Wukongopterus lii Wang et al., 2009

= Wukongopterus =

Wukongopterus Temporal range: Middle or Late Jurassic, 164 Ma

Genus of wukongopterid pterosaur from the Jurassic period

Wukongopterus is a genus of basal pterosaur, found in Liaoning, China, from the Tiaojishan Formation, of the Middle or Late Jurassic. It was unusual for having both an elongated neck and a long tail.

== Discovery and naming ==
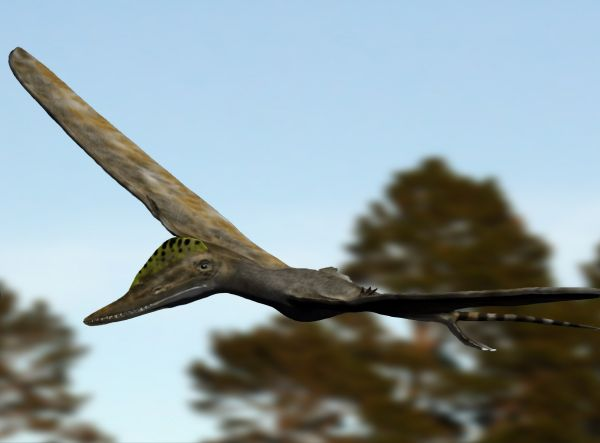
Restoration

The genus was described and named in 2009 by Wang Xiaolin, Alexander Kellner, Jiang Shunxing and Meng Xi. The genus name is derived from Sun Wukong, the Monkey King, the main hero of the Chinese classic novel Journey to the West, and a Latinized Greek pteron, "wing". The specific name honours Li Yutong, senior preparator of the Institute of Vertebrate Paleontology and Paleoanthropology (IVPP).

The genus is based on holotype IVPP V15113, a nearly complete but compressed skeleton lacking the back and middle of the skull. The type individual appears to have broken its shin during life. Its wingspan is estimated at 730 millimeters (29 in). Wukongopterus also may have had an uropatagium, a membrane between the hind legs.

== Classification ==
Below is a cladogram following Wang et al. (2017)

- Monofenestrata
  - Wukongopterus lii
  - - Darwinopterus
      - Darwinopterus modularis
      - Darwinopterus robustodens
      - Darwinopterus linglongtaensis
    - - Kunpengopterus sinensis
      - - Douzhanopterus zhangi
        - - "Painten pro-pterodactyloid" (Propterodactylus)
          - Pterodactyloidea

== See also ==
- Timeline of pterosaur research
- Darwinopterus
- List of pterosaur genera
- Tiaojishan Formation
- 2009 in paleontology
