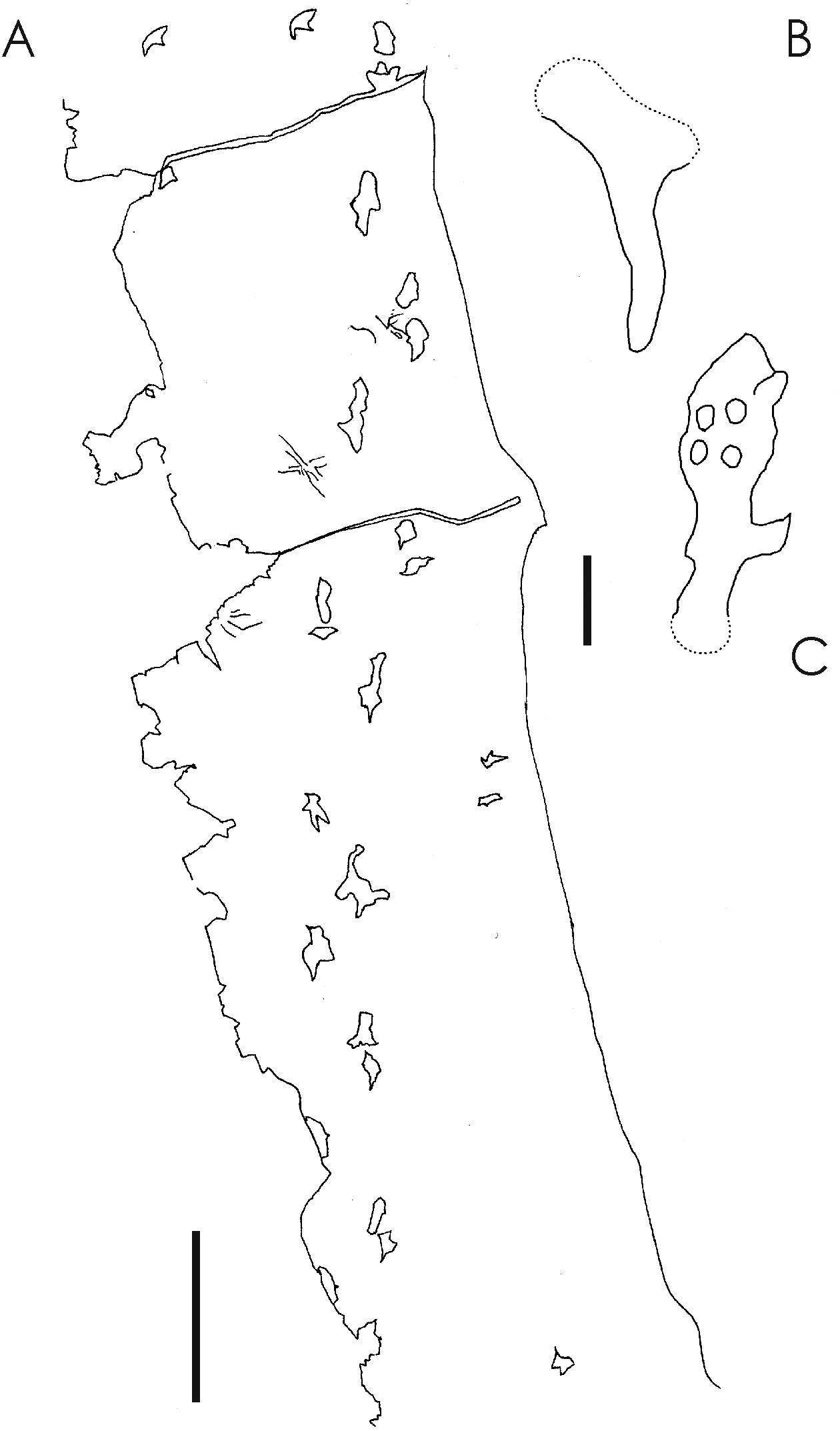
- Trackway of H. sp. (A), and holotype of H. uhangriensis (B and C)

Trace fossil classification
- Ichnogenus: Haenamichnus; Hwang et al., 2002

Type ichnospecies
- Haenamichnus uhangriensis Hwang et al., 2002

= Haenamichnus =

Haenamichnus Temporal range: Campanian 81–79 Ma

Ichnogenus of probable azhdarchid pterosaurs

Haenamichnus is an ichnogenus of probable azhdarchid pterosaurs from the Late Cretaceous (Campanian) of South Korea. The type and only ichnospecies is H. uhangriensis, representing the largest known trace fossil made by a pterosaur.

== Discovery and naming ==
The excavation of tracksites in the Uhangri Formation was conducted from 1996 to 1998, and 443 pterosaur footprints were found in the upper part of the formation. In 2002, paleontologists Koo-Geun Hwang, Min Huh, Martin Lockley, David Unwin and Joanna Wright named the type ichnospecies Haenamichnus uhangriensis, based on fossil tracks they found in the Uhangri Formation of South Korea. The ichnogeneric name means 'trace of Haenam County', while the ichnospecific name is in reference to the Uhangri Formation. The age of the Uhangri Formation is estimated around 81 to 79 million years ago during the Campanian stage. Some Campanian azhdarchid tracks found in the Cerro del Pueblo Formation of Mexico and the Wapiti Formation of Canada might belong to this ichnogenus.

=== Formerly assigned ichnospecies ===
A putative second ichnospecies, H. gainensis, was reported from the Early Cretaceous (Albian) Haman Formation, but this ichnotaxon is now reassigned to as the archosaur trace fossil Batrachopus cf. grandis, made by either a bipedal crocodylomorph or therizinosaur.

== Classification ==
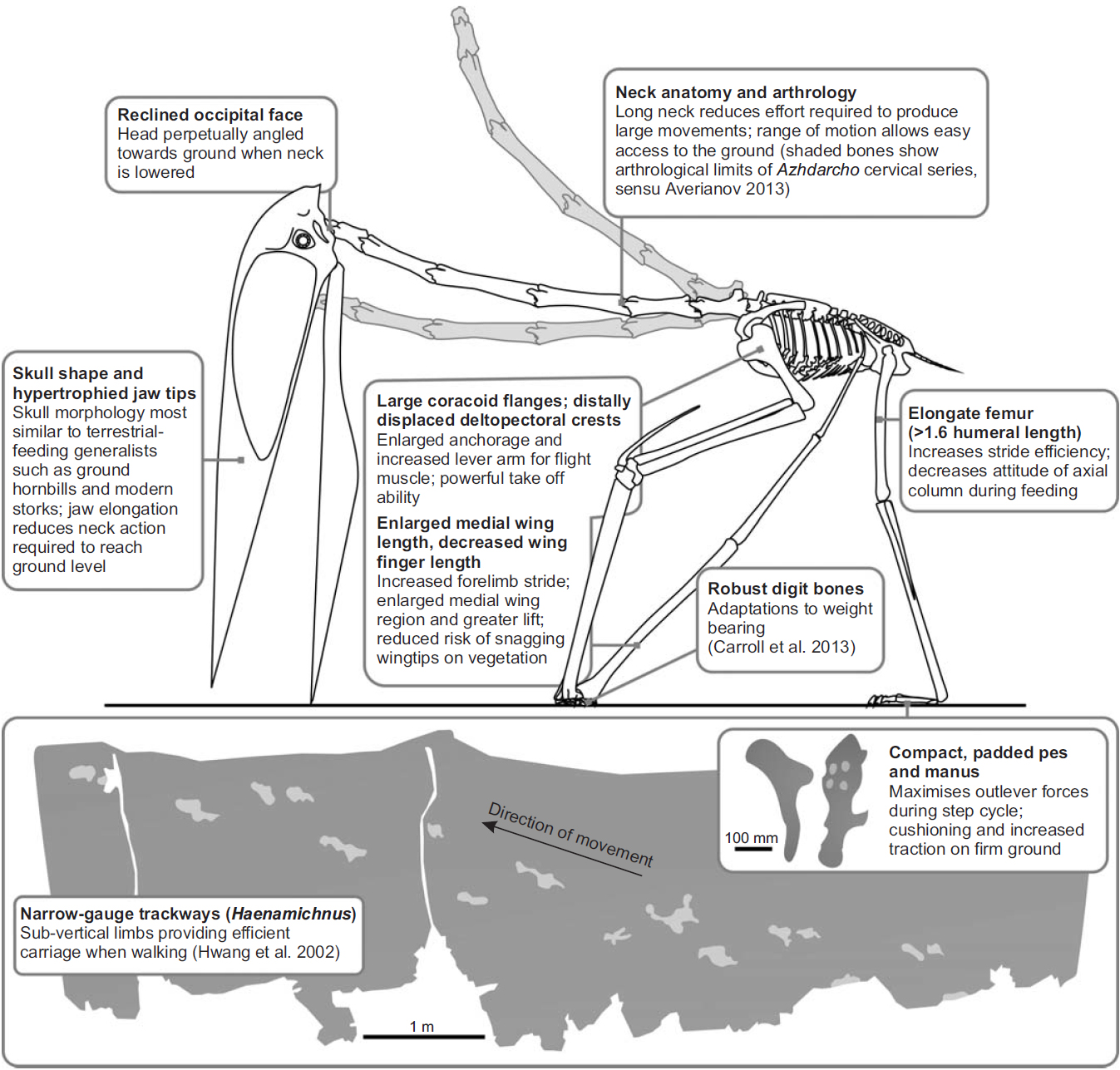
Haenamichnus (below) and skeleton of Zhejiangopterus used to illustrate the terrestrial stalking azhdarchid hypothesis

The trackmaker of Haenamichnus uhangriensis is probably a large azhdarchid pterosaur, based on large pes print up to 350 mm in length, likely reaching 10 m (33 ft) in wingspan, 3 m (9.8 ft) in height and 145 kg (320 lb) in body mass, more than ten times heavier than the Kori bustard. Meanwhile, much common and smaller Haenamichnus sp. tracks from the Uhangri Formation, based on pes print up to 280 mm in length, represents medium-sized azhdarchids reaching 5–6 metres (16–20 ft) in wingspan.

Azhdarchids are the only group of pterosaurs to which trackways have been assigned, including Haenamichnus which matches this group in shape, age, and size. One long trackway of this kind shows that azhdarchids walked with their limbs held directly underneath their body, and along with the morphology of their feet indicates they were more proficient on the ground than other pterosaurs. According to Witton, their proportions indicate they were not good swimmers on the other hand, and though they could probably launch from water, they were not as good at this as some other pterosaur groups.

Haenamichnus was initially classified within the ichnofamily Pteraichnidae, but Masrour et al. (2018) included both Agadirichnus and Haenamichnus within their newly proposed ichnofamily, Agadirichnidae. Although it is notable for being the largest known pterosaur track, because the type series is rather poorly preserved and lacks stable shape, a redescription with more specimens of this ichnogenus might be required to confirm its ichnotaxonomic validity.

== See also ==
- Timeline of pterosaur research
- Ichnology
- Pterosaur ichnogenera
