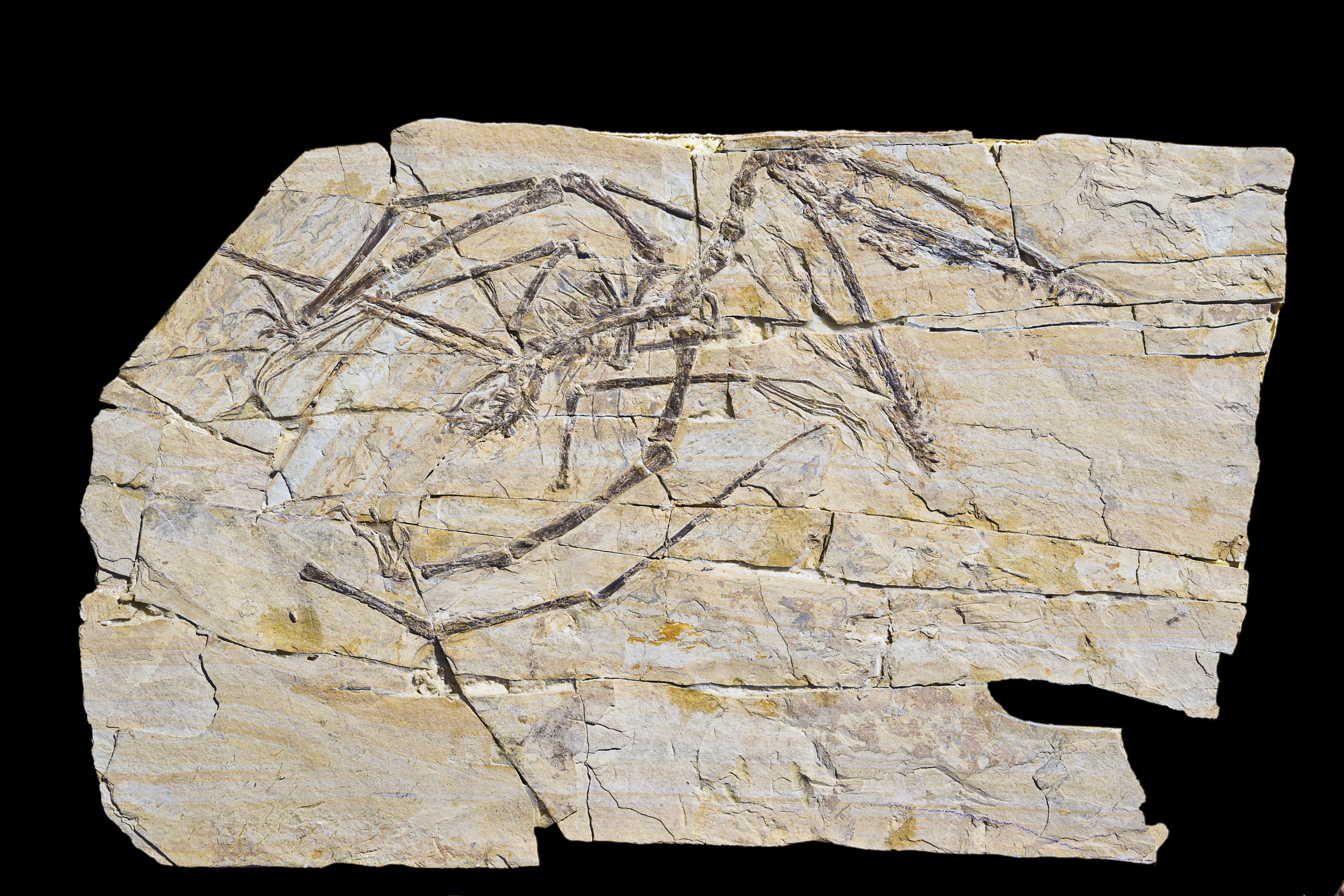
- Fossil specimen of Darwinopterus modularis

Scientific classification
- Kingdom: Animalia
- Phylum: Chordata
- Class: Reptilia
- Order: †Pterosauria
- Clade: †Darwinoptera
- Family: †Wukongopteridae; Wang et al., 2009

Type species
- †Wukongopterus lii Wang et al., 2009

Genera
- †Archaeoistiodactylus?; †Changchengopterus?; †Kunpengopterus; †Wukongopterinae; †Cuspicephalus; †Darwinopterus; †Wukongopterus

= Wukongopteridae =

Wukongopterids Temporal range: Middle Jurassic-Late Jurassic, 164–153 Ma

Family of darwinopteran pterosaurs from the Jurassic period

Wukongopteridae is a group of basal pterosaurs, found in China and the UK. It contains eight species in five genera, all dated to the Middle to Late Jurassic period,

The Wukongopteridae were first named by Wang et al. in 2009, not yet giving an exact definition. The clade Wukongopteridae was first defined by Wang et al. in 2010 as "the most recent common ancestor of Wukongopterus lii and Kunpengopterus sinensis, and all of its descendants".

== Description ==
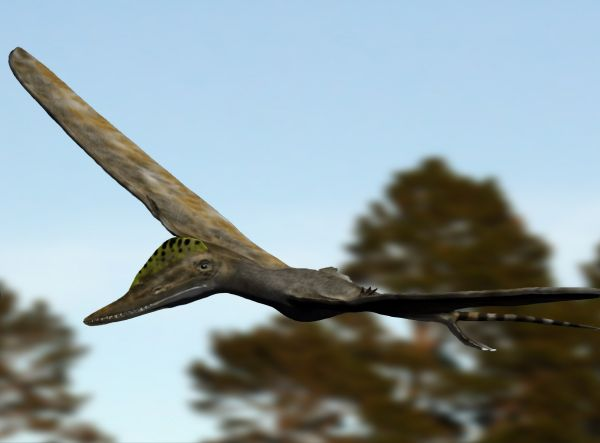
Restoration of Wukongopterus lii

Wukongopterids are characterized by a unique combination of "primitive" and advanced pterosaurian features. While they had long tails and other features characteristic of other "rhamphorhynchoids", they also had distinct pterodactyloid features, such as long vertebrae in the neck and a single skull opening in front of the eyes, the nasoantorbital fenestra (in most "rhamphorhynchoids", the antorbital fenestra and the nasal opening are separate). This feature lead to Darwinopterus modularis being placed by Lü e.a. in a new clade of pterosaurs, the Monofenestrata, or "with a single opening", forming this group together with the true Pterodactyloidea, to the exclusion of the Rhamphorhynchidae and other more primitive pterosaurs which had separate nasal and antorbital fenestrae. However, according to Wang e.a. it is equally possible that the Wukongopteridae formed a more basal group, below the Rhamphorhynchidae.
