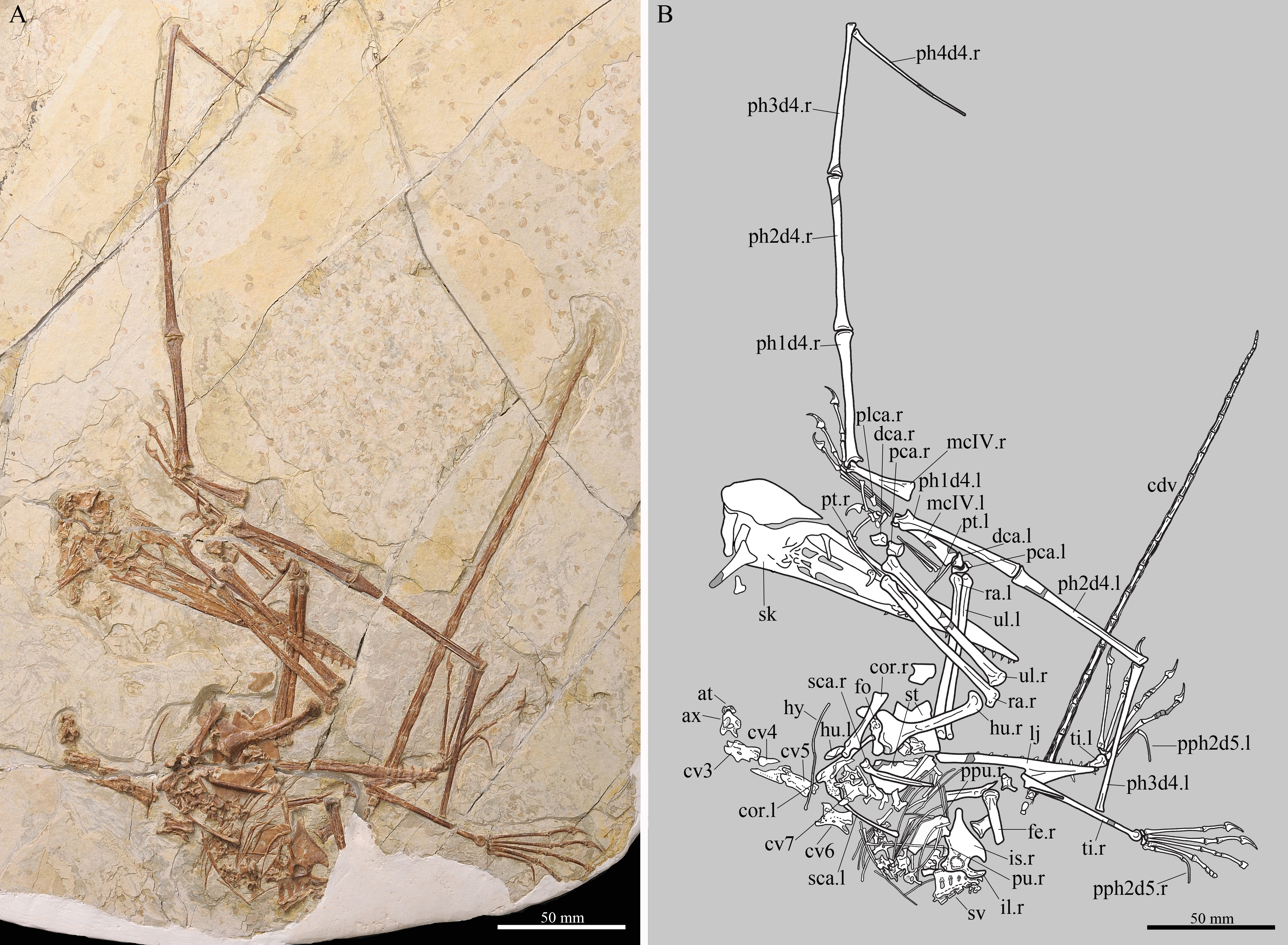
- Referred specimen of K. sinensis

Scientific classification
- Kingdom: Animalia
- Phylum: Chordata
- Class: Reptilia
- Order: †Pterosauria
- Family: †Wukongopteridae
- Genus: †Kunpengopterus; Wang et al., 2010

Type species
- †Kunpengopterus sinensis Wang et al., 2010

Other species
- †K. antipollicatus Zhou et al. 2021

= Kunpengopterus =

Kunpengopterus Temporal range: Middle?-Late Jurassic, 154 Ma

Genus of wukongopterid pterosaur from the Jurassic period

Kunpengopterus is a genus of wukongopterid pterosaur from the middle-late Jurassic Tiaojishan Formation of northeastern China. The genus contains two species, the type species K. sinensis and K. antipollicatus.

== History of discovery ==
K. sinensis is known from the holotype specimen IVPP V16047, an almost complete skeleton with complete skull and lower jaws recovered from rocks of the Tiaojishan Formation in Linglongta, Jianchang County, western Liaoning. The age of these layers is controversial. This compression fossil is of an adult individual. Aside from the bones some soft parts were also preserved and the remains of a possibly regurgitated fish.

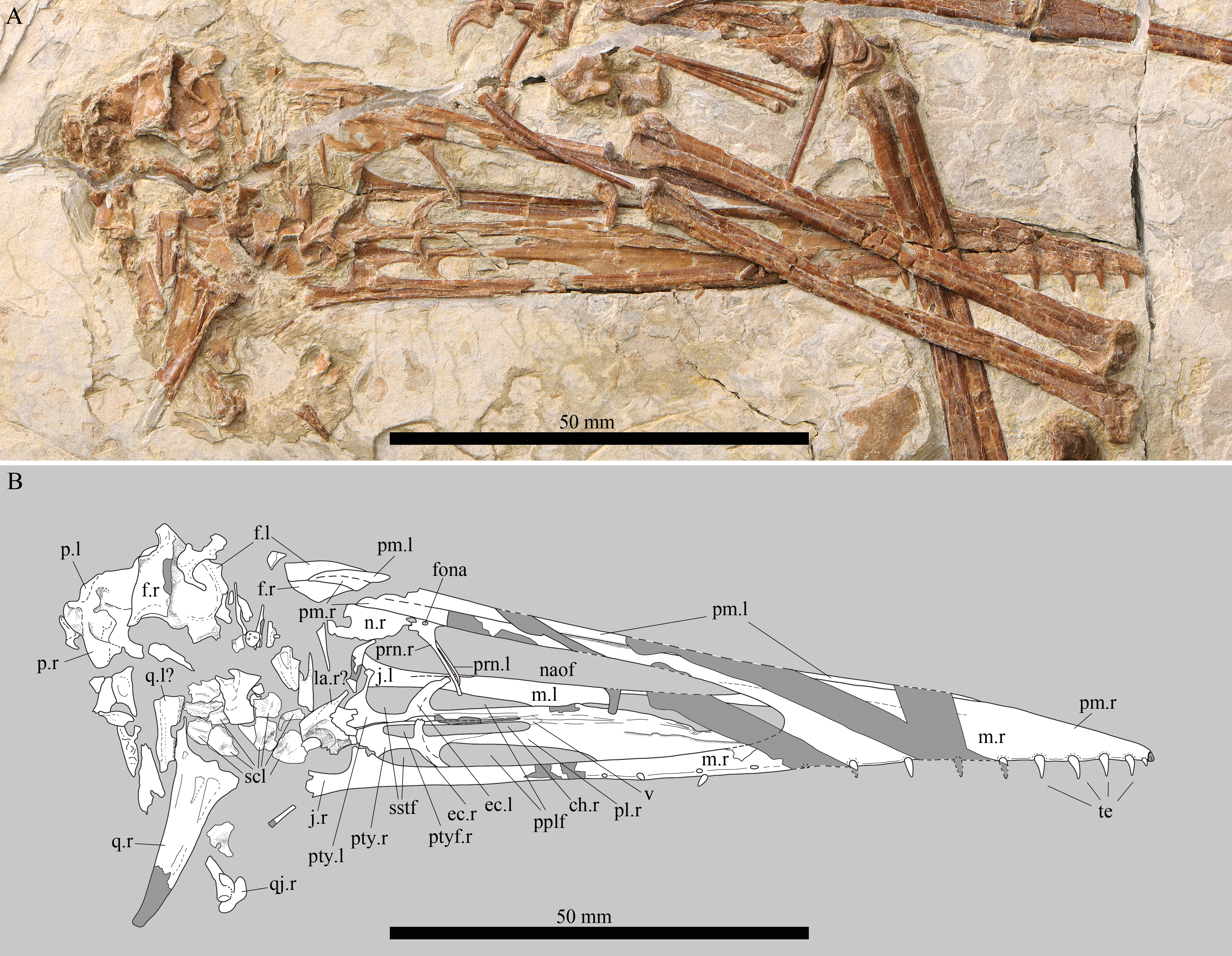
Skull of the referred specimen of K. sinensis

Kunpengopterus was named and described by Wang Xiaolin, Alexander Wilhelm Armin Kellner, Jiang Shunxing, Cheng Xin, Meng Xi and Taissa Rodrigues in 2010. The type species is Kunpengopterus sinensis. The generic name combines the Kun, a large fish or whale from Chinese folklore that could transform itself into the Peng, a gigantic colourful bird providing a mythological explanation of the northern lights, with a Latinised Greek pteron, "wing". The specific name refers to the Chinese origin.

In 2017, an additional specimen, IVPP V 23674, was referred and described. It consists of a skeleton with skull.

A second species of Kunpengopterus was described in 2021 by Xuanyu Zhou and colleagues, Kunpengopterus antipollicatus. The specific name is from the Ancient Greek anti "opposite" and pollex "thumb", and refers to the opposed first finger (a thumb) on the wing.

== Description ==
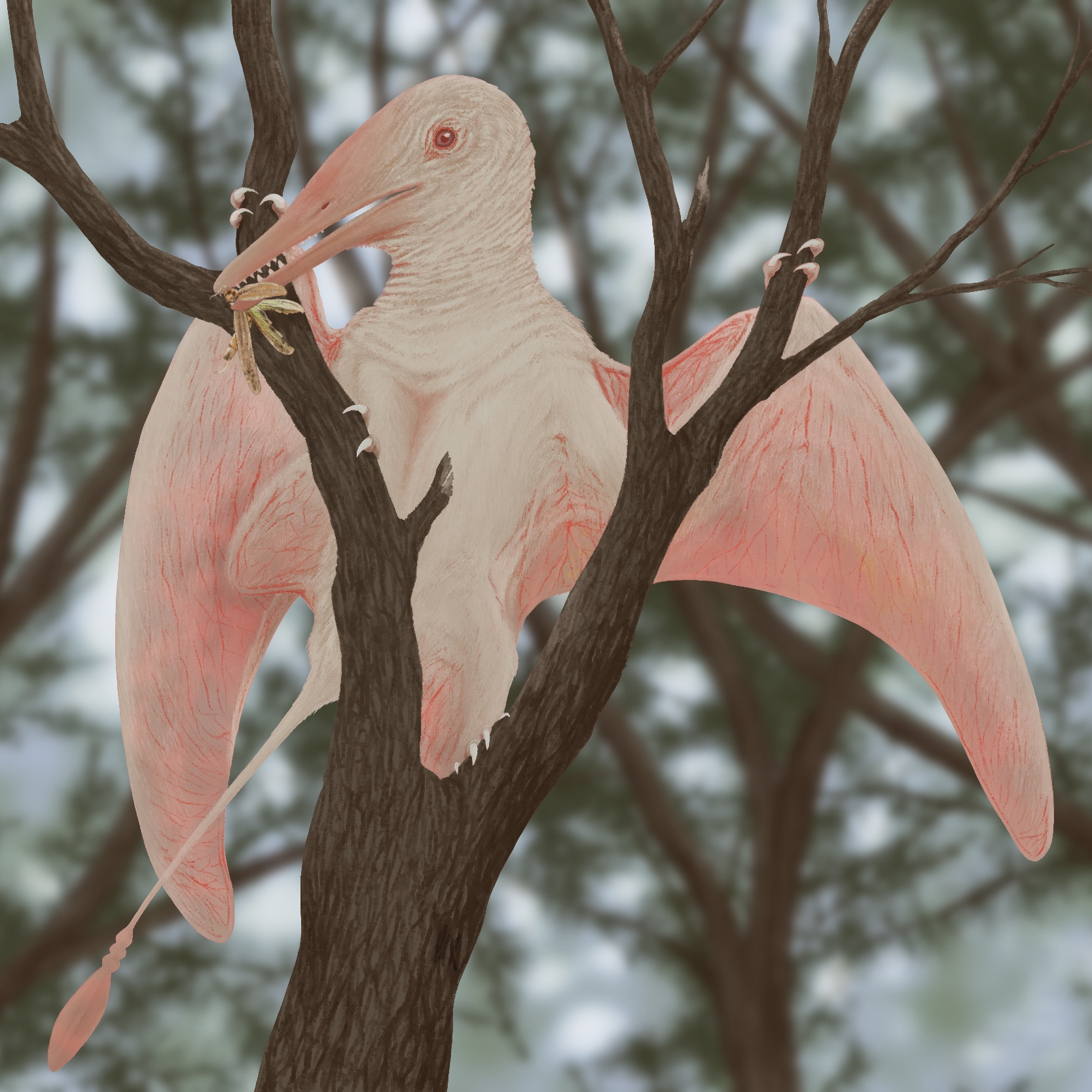
Speculative life restoration of K. antipollicatus

Kunpengopterus sinensis has an elongated head, 10.7 centimetres (4.2 in) long. The cervical vertebrae too are relatively long. The naris is confluent with the antorbital fenestra, but these large openings are still partly separated by a broad and anteriorly directed processus nasalis which has itself a small vertical tear-shaped opening. A low bony crest is present on the skull, just behind the eyes; preserved soft tissue shows it was elongated by cartilage and a yellow discolouration indicates it was perhaps enlarged to the back by a skin flap. There is no sign of a crest on the snout or of a keel under the lower jaws. The back of the skull is rounded. Kunpengopterus has a long stiff tail. The fifth toe is also long and strongly curved.

K. antipollicatus has an opposable pollux or thumb, which is rare amongst non-mammals. K. antipollicatus has also been called the "Monkeydactyl", because of the thumbs.

== Biology ==
=== Sexual variation ===
The first Kunpengopterus specimen in which sex could be confidently identified was specimen ZMNH M8802 in the collections of the Zhejiang Museum of Natural History, nicknamed "Mrs T" (short for "Mrs Pterodactyl"), originally described by Lü Junchang and colleagues in January 2011 as a specimen of Darwinopterus. In 2015, Wang e.a. reassigned the "Mrs T" specimen to Kunpengopterus, and in 2021 it was classified as a specimen of the new species Kunpengopterus antipollicatus. This specimen was preserved with the impression of an egg between its thighs in close association with its pelvis. This specimen had a broad pelvis and lacked any evidence of a crest. The egg was probably expelled from the body during decomposition, and its association with the Kunpengopterus individual was used to support the hypothesis of sexual dimorphism.

However, this hypothesis has been criticized. Pterosaur researcher Kevin Padian questioned some of the conclusions drawn by Lü et al., suggesting in a 2011 interview that, in other animals with elaborate display crests (such as ceratopsian dinosaurs), the size and shape of the crests change dramatically with age. He noted that the "Mrs T" specimen may simply have been a sub-adult which had not yet developed a crest (most animals are able to reproduce before they are fully grown). Furthermore, a rigorous analysis of wukongopterid variation published in 2017 noted that crests among wukongopterids were subject to a large amount of individual variation, and that there was no consistent dimorphism in the pelvic anatomy of crested and uncrested wukongopterid specimens.

=== Reproduction ===
The specimen preserved along with an egg (nicknamed "Mrs T"), described by Lü and colleagues in 2011, offers insight into the reproductive strategies of Kunpengopterus and pterosaurs in general. Like the eggs of later pterosaurs and modern reptiles, the eggs of Kunpengopterus had a parchment-like, soft shell. In modern birds, the eggshell is hardened with calcium, completely shielding the embryo from the outside environment. Soft-shelled eggs are permeable, and allow significant amounts of water to be absorbed into the egg during development. Eggs of this type are more vulnerable to the elements and are typically buried in soil. The eggs of Kunpengopterus would have weighed about 6 grams (0.21 oz) when they were laid, but due to moisture intake, they may have doubled in weight by the time of hatching. The eggs were small compared to the size of the mother (the "Mrs T" specimen weighed between 110 grams [3.9 oz] and 220 grams [7.8 oz]), also more like modern reptiles than birds. David Unwin, a co-author of the paper, suggested that Kunpengopterus probably laid many small eggs at a time and buried them, and that juveniles could fly upon hatching, requiring little to no parental care. These results imply that reproduction in pterosaurs was more like that in modern reptiles and significantly differed from reproduction in birds. However, in 2015, the counterplate of the specimen was reported, IVPP V18403, which showed a single additional egg present in the body, indicating that there were two active ovaries, producing a single egg at a time.

== Classification ==
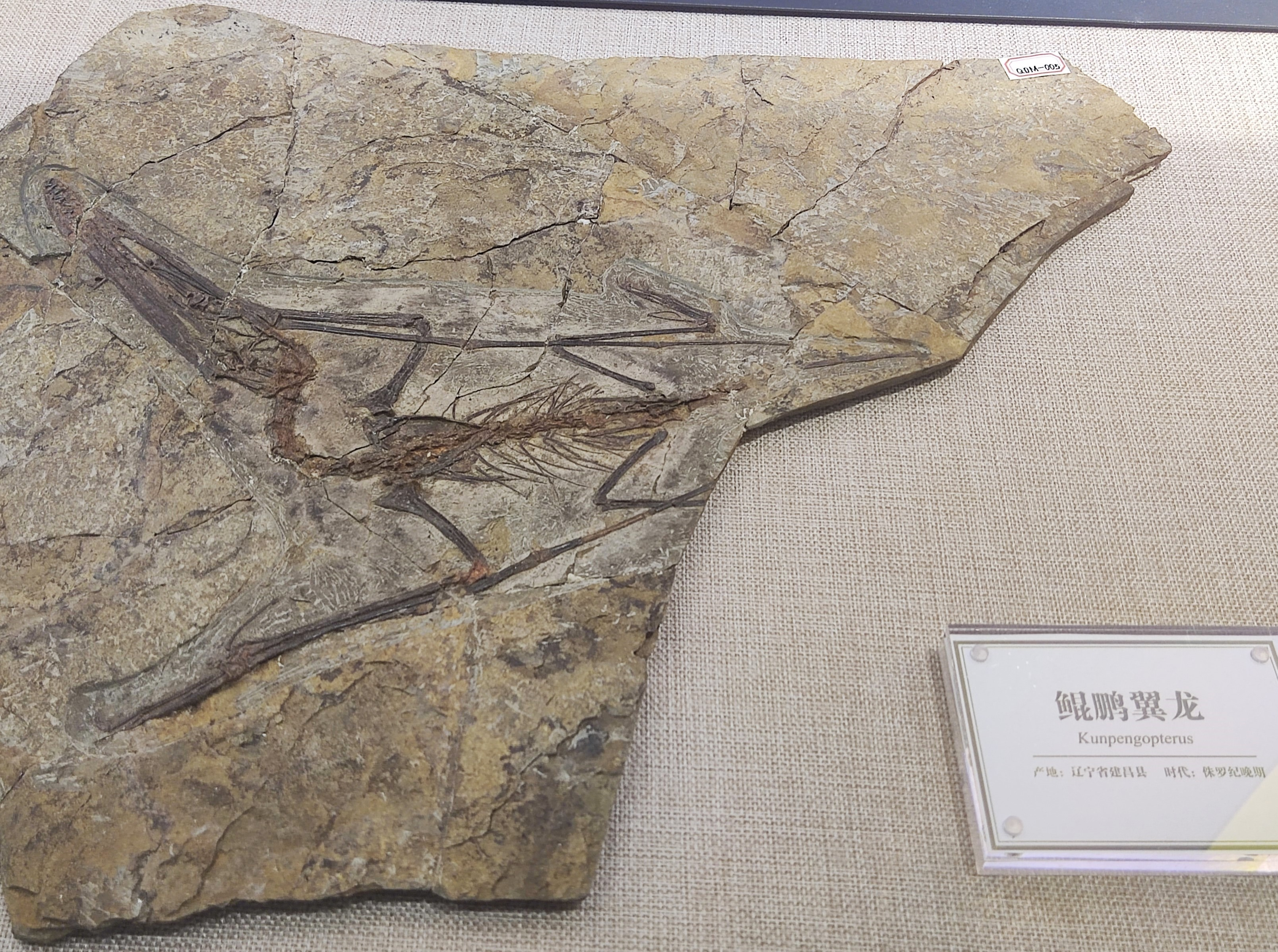
Fossil in Liaoning Palaeontological Museum

Kunpengopterus was assigned to the Wukongopteridae, a family of pterosaurs showing a mix of basal and derived pterodactyloid traits. The cladogram below is reproduced from Zhou et al. (2021) and includes both species of Kunpengopterus:

- Monofenestrata
  - - Changchengopterus pani
    - Pterodactyloidea
  - Darwinoptera
    - Pterorhynchus wellnhoferi
    - Wukongopteridae
      - - Kunpengopterus sinensis
        - Kunpengopterus antipollicatus
      - Wukongopterinae
        - Wukongopterus lii
        - - Cuspicephalus scarfii
          - Darwinopterus modularis

== See also ==
- List of pterosaur genera
- Timeline of pterosaur research
