= Uhangri Formation =

Fossil site in Haenam-eup, South Korea

- Stratigraphic range: Campanian; 81–79 Ma
- Type: Geological formation
- Unit of: Haenam Group
- Underlies: Hwangsan Tuff
- Overlies: Andesitic Tuff
- Thickness: 400 meters

Lithology
- Primary: Sandstone
- Other: Shale

Location
- Coordinates: 34.6°N 126.4°E
- Approximate paleocoordinates: 38.5°N 115.0°E
- Region: Haenam, Jeollanam-do
- Country: South Korea

Type section
- Named for: Uhangri, Haenam
- Uhangri Formation (South Korea)

The Uhangri Formation (Korean: 우항리층; Hanja: 牛項里層; RR: Uhangni-cheung), located at the Haenam, Jeollanam-do, South Korea is a non-marine geological formation known with epiclastic fluvio-lacustrine sequence with minor volcaniclastics. Ichnofossils are found in the upper part of the Uhangri Formation, and they are associated with ripple marks, indicating the part of the formation was the shallow lake margin.

== Fossil contents ==
=== Ichnofossils ===
Pterosaur, dinosaur, and bird tracks are preserved in situ, nearby the Haenam Uhangri Dinosaur Museum. Unnamed tracks of theropods, sauropods and ornithopods are known from the Uhangri Formation. Star-shaped dinosaur trackway with an unknown trackmaker has been discovered and described. It is unsure whether it represents manus-only trackway made by a sauropod trackmaker during swimming, or undertracks made by an ornithopod trackmaker.

Ichnofossils of the Uhangri Formation
Genus	Species	Presence	Description	Images
Haenamichnus	H. uhangriensis	Site P2	Pes size 350mm, consistent with gigantic azhdarchid pterosaurs. Pad impressions present on pes.	
Haenamichnus	H. isp.	Site P1, Site P4 and Site P9	Pes size 200-220mm, consistent with azhdarchid pterosaurs wingspan of 5-6m. Length of the trackway from Site P9 is 7.3 meters long, representing the longest pterosaur trackway.	
Hwangsanipes	H. choughi		Ornithuromorph bird tracks with webbings.	
Uhangrichnus	U. chuni		Ornithuromorph bird tracks without webbings.	
Caririchnium	C. isp.		Ornithopod tracks	
Lithographus	L. hieroglypichus		Arthropod tracks, associated with burrows and a resting trace. Possibly made by Dragonfly nymphs.	

=== Ostracods ===
Ostracods of the Uhangri Formation
Genus	Species	Presence	Description	Images
Cypridea	C. sp.			
Candona	C. sp.			
Eucythere	E. sp.			

=== Paleoflora ===
Plants of the Uhangri Formation
Genus	Species	Presence	Description	Images
Cupressinoxylon	C. uhangriense			
Taxodioxylon	T. cf. nihongii			

== See also ==
- List of fossil sites
