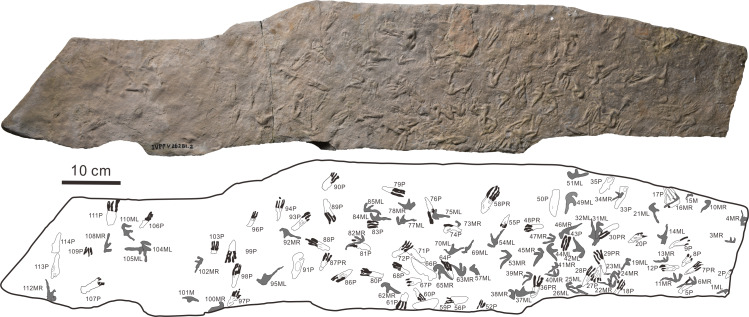
- P. wuerhoensis trackway (holotype is 45MR and 58PR, paratype is 7PR and 29PR)

Trace fossil classification
- Kingdom: Animalia
- Phylum: Chordata
- Class: Reptilia
- Order: †Pterosauria
- Suborder: †Pterodactyloidea
- Ichnofamily: †Pteraichnidae
- Ichnogenus: †Pteraichnus; Stokes, 1957

Type ichnospecies
- †Pteraichnus saltwashensis Stokes, 1957

Ichnospecies
- †Pteraichnus saltwashensis Stokes, 1957; †Pteraichnus stokesi Lockley et al., 1995; †Pteraichnus palacieisaenzi Pascual-Arribas and Sanz-Pérez, 2000; †Pteraichnus parvus Fuentes Vidarte et al., 2004; †Pteraichnus longipodus Fuentes Vidarte et al., 2004; †Pteraichnus koreanensis Lee et al., 2008; †Pteraichnus nipponensis Lee et al., 2010; †Pteraichnus gracilis Ha et al., 2022

= Pteraichnus =

Pteraichnus is an ichnogenus that has been attributed to pterosaurs. As of 2025, eight valid ichnospecies have been described from various units.

== See also ==
- Timeline of pterosaur research
- Ichnology
- Pterosaur ichnogenera
