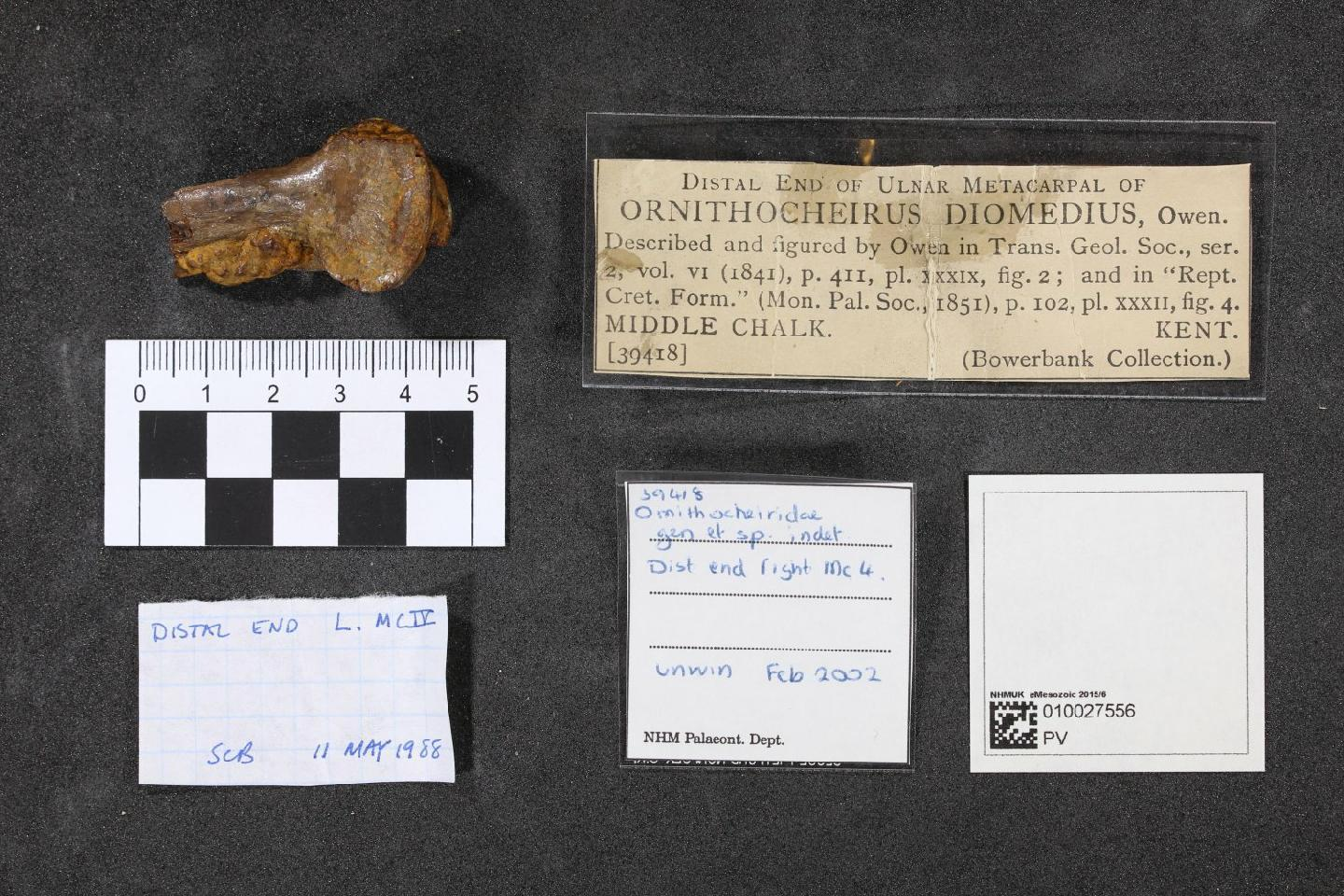
- Holotype metacarpal

Scientific classification
- Kingdom: Animalia
- Phylum: Chordata
- Class: Reptilia
- Order: †Pterosauria
- Suborder: †Pterodactyloidea
- Clade: †Azhdarchoidea
- Genus: †Cimoliornis; Owen, 1846

Type species
- †Cimoliornis diomedeus Owen, 1846

Synonyms
- Ornithocheirus diomedeus (Owen, 1846); Pterodactylus diomedeus (Owen, 1846); Pterodactylus giganteus Morris, 1854

= Cimoliornis =

Cimoliornis Temporal range: Late Cretaceous, 80 Ma

Extinct genus of pterosaurs

Cimoliornis is a pterosaur genus containing the single species Cimoliornis diomedeus, meaning "long-winged bird of the chalk". It is known from a partial metacarpal (lower wing bone) found in late Cretaceous period English Chalk Formation of the UK.

== History ==
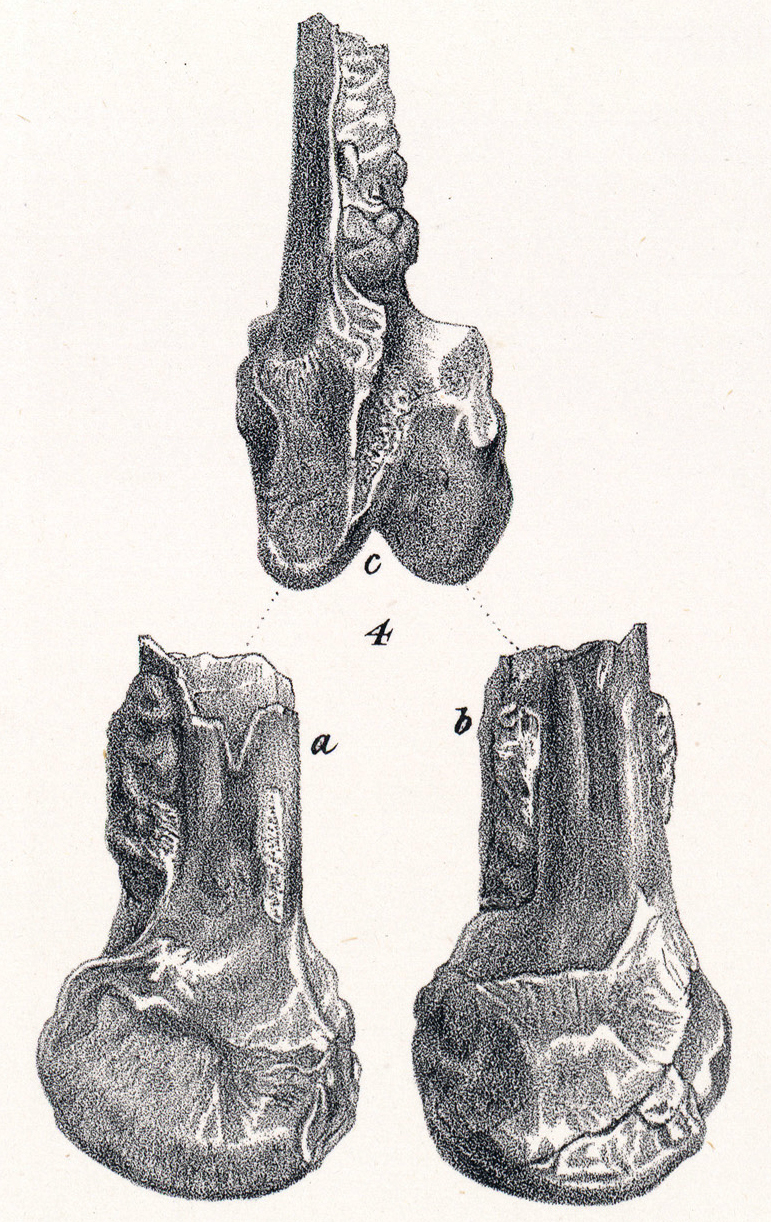
1846 illustration of the holotype in multiple views

The discovery of Cimoliornis remains was first announced in 1840 by Sir Richard Owen. The remains consisted of a single partial wing bone broken into three pieces, which had been acquired by William Cole, 3rd Earl of Enniskillen, and studied by Enniskillen and William Buckland, who both thought the bone came from a species of giant Cretaceous bird similar to an albatross. Owen agreed that it was a bird, and argued that it may either have been from an albatross sized bird (if it was a humerus) or a much larger bird (if it was a radius). On the latter possibility, Owen wrote that a bird of that size would have been reminiscent of the "fabulous Roc of Arabian romance."

In 1842, James Scott Bowerbank re-examined the remains and concluded that they actually belonged to a pterosaur, based on the microstructure of the bones, and estimated that it would have had a wingspan of about 2.5–3 metres (8 ft 2 in – 9 ft 10 in). By modern standards, the remains are too fragmentary to calculate a reliable wingspan estimate, but Cimoliornis diomedeus was undoubtedly the largest known pterosaur until the 1857 discovery of larger Ornithocheirus species.

== See also ==
- List of pterosaur genera
- Timeline of pterosaur research
