= 1986 in paleontology =

Paleontology or palaeontology is the study of prehistoric life forms on Earth through the examination of plant and animal fossils. This includes the study of body fossils, tracks (ichnites), burrows, cast-off parts, fossilised feces (coprolites), palynomorphs and chemical residues. Because humans have encountered fossils for millennia, paleontology has a long history both before and after becoming formalized as a science. This article records significant discoveries and events related to paleontology that occurred or were published in the year 1986.

== Plants ==
=== Pinophytes ===
Name	Novelty	Status	Authors	Age	Type Strata	Location	Notes	Images
Abies milleri	sp nov	Valid	Schorn & Wehr	Eocene; Ypresian	Eocene Okanagan Highlands; Klondike Mountain Formation	USA	One of the oldest fir species	Abies milleri

=== Angiosperms ===
Name	Novelty	Status	Authors	Age	Type Strata	Location	Notes	Images
Macginicarpa	Gen et sp nov	valid	Manchester	Middle Eocene	Clarno Formation	USA; Oregon	A platanaceous infructescence genus. Type species M. glabra.	
Macginistemon	Gen et comb nov	valid	(MacGinitie) Manchester	Middle Eocene	Clarno Formation	USA; Oregon	A platanaceous stamen species. Moved from Calycites mikanoides 1941.	
Macginitiea angustiloba	Comb nov	valid	(Lesquereux) Manchester	Middle Eocene	Clarno Formation	USA; Oregon	A platanaceous species. Moved from Aralia angustiloba 1878.	
Platananthus	Gen et sp nov	valid	Manchester	Middle Eocene	Clarno Formation	USA; Oregon	A platanaceous staminate inflorescence genus. Type species P. synandrus.	

== Newly described insects ==
Name	Novelty	Status	Authors	Age	Type Strata	Location	Notes	Images
Stenolestes fischeri	Sp nov	Valid	Nel	Chattian		France	A Sieblosiid damselfly.	Stenolestes fischeri

== Molluscs ==
=== Bivalves ===
Name	Novelty	Status	Authors	Age	Type Strata	Location	Notes	Images
Buluniella	gen et sp nov	nomen dubium	Jermak	Early Cambrian	"northern Siberia"	Russia	possible jr synonym of Pojetaia	
Jellia	gen et sp nov	junior synonym	Li & Zhou	Early Cambrian	Henan province	China	jr synonym of Pojetaia runnegari	

== Fish ==
Name	Novelty	Status	Authors	Age	Type Strata	Location	Notes	Images
Dwykaselachus	Gen. et sp. nov	Valid	Oelofsen	Permian	Prince Albert Formation (Ecca Group)	South Africa	A member of Symmoriida. The type species is D. oosthuizeni.	

== Dinosaurs ==
=== Newly named dinosaurs ===
Data courtesy of George Olshevsky's dinosaur genera list.

Name	Status	Authors		Location	Notes	Images
Avaceratops	Valid taxon	Dodson		USA (Montana)		Avaceratops
Baryonyx	Valid taxon	Alan J. Charig	Angela C. Milner	Spain; England		Baryonyx
Conchoraptor	Valid taxon	Rinchen Barsbold		Mongolia		
Frenguellisaurus	Jr. synonym of Herrerasaurus	Fernando Novas		Argentina		
Lapparentosaurus	Valid taxon	Jose Bonaparte		Madagascar		
Siamosaurus	Valid taxon	Eric Buffetaut	Ingavat	Thailand		Siamosaurus
Xenotarsosaurus	Valid taxon	Martinez; Gimenez	Rodriguez; Bochatey	Argentina		

=== Newly named birds ===
Name	Status	Novelty	Authors	Age	Unit	Location	Notes	Images
Asiavis	Valid	Gen. nov. et Sp. nov.	Nessov	Middle Eocene		Uzbekistan	A Cygninae, type species A. phosphatica	
Bubo insularis	Valid	Sp. nov.	Mourer-Chauviré & Weesie	Late Pleistocene		France: Corsica; Italy: Sardinia	A Strigidae.	
Eopuffinus	Valid	Gen. et Sp. nov.	Nessov	Late Paleocene		Kazakhstan	A Procellariidae, type species E. kazachstanensis	
Eurolimnornis	Valid	Gen. et Sp. nov.	Kessler & Jurcsák	Early Cretaceous		Romania	A Eurolimnornithidae, type species is E. corneti.	
Gallirallus ripleyi	Valid	Sp. nov.	Steadman	Holocene	Mangaia	Cook Islands	A Rallidae.	
Ichthyornis maltshevskyi	jr synonym	Sp. nov.	Nessov	Coniacian	Bissekty Formation	Uzbekistan	Described as an Ichthyornithidae, transferred to Lenesornis maltshevskyi in Kurochkin, 1996.	
Nanantius	Valid	Gen. et Sp. nov.	Molnar	Albian	Toolebuc Formation	Australia: Queensland	A Gobipteryginae Alexornithid, type species N. eos	
Palaeocursornis	Valid	Gen. nov. et Sp. nov.	Kessler & Jurcsák	Early Cretaceous		Romania	A Eurolimnornithidae, type genus P. biharicus	
Pliogyps charon	Valid	Sp. nov.	Becker	Late Miocene	Alachua Formation	USA: Florida	A Cathartidae.	
Porzana rua	Valid	Sp. nov.	Steadman	Holocene	Mangaia	Cook Islands	A Rallidae.	

== Plesiosaurs ==
=== New taxa ===
Name	Status	Authors	Location	Notes	Images
Tuarangisaurus	Valid	Wiffen Moisley	Angola; New Zealand	A Plesiosaur from New Zealand	Tuarangisaurus

== Pterosaurs ==
- Fossil jaw fragments containing multicusped teeth were found in Dockum Group rocks in western Texas. One fragment, apparently from a lower jaw, contained two teeth, each with five cusps. Another fragment, from an upper jaw, also contained several multi-cusped teeth. These finds are very similar to the pterosaur genus Eudimorphodon and may be attributable to this genus, although without better fossil remains it is impossible to be sure.

=== New taxa ===
Name	Status	Authors	Notes
Phobetor	Junior Synonym	Bakhurina	Synonym of Noripterus.

== Synapsids ==
=== Mammals ===
Name	Novelty	Status	Authors	Age	Type Strata	Location	Notes	Images
Hulitherium tomasetti		Valid	Tomasetti & Plane	Pleistocene		Papua New Guinea	A Diprotodont Metatherian.	
Rostriamynodon grangeri	Gen et sp nov	Valid	Wall & Manning	Early late Eocene	Irdin Manha Formation	China	An amynodontid	
