= Mangaia crake =

Mangaia crake Temporal range: Late Holocene

Conservation status
- Extinct (early 15th century)

Scientific classification
- Kingdom: Animalia
- Phylum: Chordata
- Class: Aves
- Order: Gruiformes
- Family: Rallidae
- Genus: Porzana
- Species: †P. rua

Binomial name
- †Porzana rua Steadman, 1986

Extinct species of bird

The Mangaia crake ("Porzana" rua) is an extinct species of flightless bird in the rail family, Rallidae. It was described in 1986 from subfossil bones of late Holocene age found in caves on the island of Mangaia, in the southern Cook Islands of East Polynesia. It was placed in the then-loosely circumscribed genus Porzana, but it almost certainly does not belong to Porzana proper as understood in modern times. Rather, it most likely was one of the crakes which are now separated as genus Zapornia. While the species survived for hundreds of years of Polynesian settlement, even despite the establishment of introduced predators, at some point in the last millennium Mangaia suffered an ecosystem collapse with far-reaching consequences, the extinction of "P." rua among them.

The species name rua is Cook Islands Māori for a hole in the ground, such as a sinkhole, a grave, a chasm or a cavern. It alludes to the name of the type locality, Te Rua Rere ("The Flying/Jumping/Throwing Cave"), als well to the fact that the prehistoric deposits of Mangaia were metaphorical "graveyards" of extinct fauna, with this rail being one of the most numerous. The holotype specimen USNM 402876 is one humerus and two tarsometatarsus bones all belonging to the same bird. They were collected on April 13, 1984.

== Description ==
It was a good-sized crake, about as large as the similarly flightless and possibly very closely related Henderson crake (Zapornia atra), or a small plump sora (one of the species remaining in Porzana today). Probably weighing 65-70 g, it was less than 20 cm long altogether, including a short tail of about 35 mm and a bill perhaps 20-25 mm long. By Zapornia crake standards, the midfoot bone (the "lower leg" of birds) was long, the femur fairly short but notably stout for a bird of its size and bulk. Humerus and ulna were shortened (and the ulna was also more delicate), even a bit shorter than in the smaller but volant Spotless crake; assuming its remiges were short as in the Henderson crake, the wing length of "P." rua was probably about 6 cm or even less.

Its plumage colour is unknown. If it does indeed belong to a group including some or all of the Henderson crake, the Spotless crake, the Kosrae crake and the Tahiti crake, it was almost certainly mostly blackish, perhaps with some whitish barring on the hindflanks, and/or some contrast between a slightly paler underside and darker and olive-tinged back and wings. Its bill would in this case most likely have been red or blackish, the eyes chestnut brown, and the legs were probably bright red but possibly yellowish.

== Ecology ==
The Mangaia crake was of the most abundant vertebrate species on its home island before humans arrived, and even for a considerable time afterwards. The type locality Te Rua Rere in Tava'enga District (northwest) has yielded bones of more than a dozen individuals alone. By 2006, the species' remains had been found also in ana Toruapuru in Ivirua District (east), ana Tapukeu in Tamarua District (southeast), ana Tuatini and Tangatatau in Veitatei District (southwest), ana Manuku in Kei'a district (west), as well as ana Tuara. It is thus documented essentially all around the island, though the localities where it has been found generally lie at the edge of the makatea karst escarpment (an uplifted fossil coral reef) towards the ring of heavily-cultivated taro fields which surround the central hill in the island's interior. While most sites have yielded only one or two bones, more than a hundred bones had been recovered from both Tangatatau and Manuku. Apparently, the Mangaia crake formerly was a plentiful species – together with the still-present Indopacific white tern, and the now-gone local populations of Black-winged petrel and Polynesian ground dove, it must have made up the bulk of the birdlife of pre-settlement Mangaia. Given that the number of rail bones in prehistoric deposits declines slowly for several centuries, and then suddenly collapses to zero, the Mangaia crake was not dependent on the central upland forest habitat, and may well have utilized all parts of the island in its pre-human state.

The habits of this rail can only be conjectured, but probably did not differ radically from that of the Henderson crake. As such, it was probably omnivorous and made use of anything edible it found, eating arthropods, seeds and perhaps occasionally fruit, as well as carrion and bird eggs and chicks. Considering that it was the second-largest and by far the most numerous of up to four rail species previously sharing the fairly small (some 50 square kilometres/20 sq. mi.) island, some competitive exclusion mechanism must have been present. Most likely, the Mangaia crake was more inclined to predation than its smaller relatives, so eggs and nestlings of the Black-winged petrel and other ground-nesting seabirds might have been a significant food item. Like on Henderson Island, the small Polynesian rats introduced by early settlers may occasionally have been killed and eaten by the rails, too. The rats, in turn, would have eaten juveniles and eggs of "P." rua, but as at least 400 years of coexistence with a large rat population proves, the rails were well able to fend off the rodents, presumably by vigorously attacking them on sight as the Henderson crake still does today. Frigatebirds would have eaten rails they surprised on open makatea rock, but the main predator of the Mangaia crake before the civil-war era (see below) was probably the endemic Nycticorax night heron, which is also extinct nowadays, but is the only known species that could have deposited the abundant rail (and other small birds') remains in the pre-human layers of ana Manuku.

== Extinction ==
The cause of its extinction is ascribed to a combination of predation by humans, and the indirect consequences of habitat alteration following human settlement of the island and the introduction of terrestrial mammals. Mangaia was first settled by humans some time before 1000 CE – possibly as early as 400 CE –, given that numerous bones of the Polynesian rat were found in 1000-year-old deposits despite little direct evidence of human habitation. In the initial phase of the settlement, the central hill was logged and converted to agricultural fields; the rails still managed to hold their own against the pressure by the habitat destruction and the depredations of the rats, dogs and pigs, and persisted in considerable numbers. At this time, Mangaia was still known as A'ua'u Enua ("terraced land") due to the hillsides being covered in crop fields. Other than the rat, the first settlers also introduced chickens, dogs and pigs, but the latter two were at one point exterminated, probably deliberately to eliminate them as competitors for human food: at some time into the second millennium CE – probably around the end of the 14th century – numerous indications of an ecological catastrophe occur on Mangaia.

As the uplands' soil fertiliy was exhausted, the hillside fields were abandoned and overgrown by Dicranopteris linearis fern, becoming known as rautuanu'e ("covered in forked fern"). Concurrently, the stocks of large fish in Lake Tiriara and the nearshore ocean seem to have collapsed due to overfishing. As a consequence, the human population had to alter their mode of subsistence drastically, and probably within the span of only a few generations. Mangaia crakes, seabirds and their eggs, and the Polynesian ground dove, which had until then been eaten at a rate that was nearly sustainable, suddenly became dominant food items and their populations rapidly plummeted, while less-desirable seafood such as sea urchins replaced crustaceans and large fish in the Mangaians' diet. Local oral history attests to a period of frequent ritualized warfare, the previous hereditary chiefdoms being replaced by a highly militarized meritocratic warlordism which constantly reassigned the remaining fertile puna swampland between the makatea and the hill to the victorious parties of the battles, while the losers were displaced to the makatea where agriculture was restricted to the occasional soil-filled cavern, until they managed to win a battle and take over a patch of puna again.

The deposit at ana Manuku even documents two incidents of mass murder and possible cannibalism – indeed, ana Manuku literally means "parting/separating cave" and is also known as are Manuku, which can be translated as "place of dismemberment", while the name of the nearby marae Tukituki Mata means "face-smashing temple" and is connected to ominous stories suggesting that habitual cannibalism was even common "in peacetime". Similar events are attested for the northeastern and northwestern ends of Mangaia as the battles named "First and Second Oven of Men" due to the victorious party burning the vanquished en masse. The Polynesian deity Rongo, usually a god of peace and abundant harvests, was transformed into a patron of warfare and irrigated taro cultivation, and a cult involving mandatory human sacrifice at each accession of a new supreme warlord became the focal point of Mangaian religion. Even trade between settlements on Mangaia largely ceased, and oversea traders which hitherto had supplied the locals with luxury goods were simply butchered as soon as they set foot on the island, causing Mangaia to be isolated from the rest of the world until James Cook's ships arrived on 29 March 1777.

Not only did humans perish in large numbers during that time, but many of the remaining endemic landbirds of Mangaia did not survive either: the Mangaia crake is attested in the initial post-settlement layers of the Tangatatau Rockshelter as frequently as in the pre-human strata, before its numbers start to decline roughly around 1100 CE but still remain comparatively abundant for some time. Tangatatau deposits from about 1300 CE onwards contain very few rail bones however, and soon thereafter none at all, while the species is still attested (but in much diminished numbers already) in the deposits of the first homicidal event at ana Manuku, but absent from the second one which took place only a few decades later. Due to the good stratigraphic data and formerly large population providing numerous well-dateable specimens, the Mangaia crake's extinction can thus be quite precisely dated to the first half of the 15th century CE, most likely around 1425.

A similar fate was only avoided by the Henderson crake due to Henderson Island being slightly smaller and less fertile than Mangaia, which caused its entire human population to die off in an ecological collapse even more severe than that on Mangaia. The Kosrae crake, too, managed to withstand Polynesian rat predation and human hunting throughout the several centuries of the Leluh dynasty's rule, only to succumb quickly to the larger rats introduced from Europe.

== See also ==
- Cannibalism in Oceania
- List of birds of the Cook Islands
