= Bauxite of Cornet =

Vertebrate fossil site in Romania

The Bauxite of Cornet-Lens 204 is an underground, isolated, discoidal subcircular lens of bauxite, called Lens 204 that yielded over 10,000 fossil bones. These fossils were found when Lens 24 was mined for bauxite at the Brusturi Mine near Cornet and Oradea, Romania. This lens is one of several hundred, small bauxite deposits associated with a deeply weathered, karstic paleosurface eroded into Late Jurassic limestones of the Pădurea Craiului Mountains. and buried by Cretaceous limestones. The majority of these Late Berriasian bauxite deposits are the erosional remnants of thick paleosols developed on this paleosurface. A small number of them, like Lens 204, consist of bauxite eroded from these paleosols and redeposited in caves and fissures and subsequently further altered by groundwater. Of these bauxitic cave and fissure fills, only the Lens 204 cave fill has been found to contain abundant fossil bones of Lower Cretaceous dinosaurs, reptiles, and, purportedly, birds.

== Location ==
This fossil bone-bearing Cornet bauxite deposit, Lens 204, occurs underground as an isolated lens in the Mine Brusturi. This mine is about 4 km (2.5 mi) south of the mining buildings of the Cornet branch of the S.C. ‘‘Bauxita Min‘‘ S.A. Dobreʂti company. The Mine Brusturi lies in the Comuna Aʂtileu of the Padurea Craiului mountains in the eastern part of Judetul (Province) Bihor County, Romania, about 40 km (25 mi) east-south-east of Oradea.

Lens 204 lies 40 m (130 ft) below the level of the entrance to the Brusturi Mine. It is only reached by a steeply inclined adit and connecting side adits. This bauxite lens, which is kidney-shaped in outline, is about 35 m (115 ft) long and 20 m (66 ft) wide. A normal fault divides Lens 204 in half and has downthrown the eastern bone-rich portion by more than 40 m (130 ft). The associated mine chamber is roughly circular in shape and small, about 8 m (26 ft) long and 4 m (13 ft) wide.

== History ==
In 1978, Lens 204 of the Brusturi Mine was first identified by a borehole and adits were constructed to it. The mining and associated blasting of it began in July 1978. During the initial mining, vertebratefossils were discovered by miners, Ioan Bumb and Petru Lele, in the bauxite of Lens 204. Tiberiu Jurcsák and Elisabeta Popa, paleontologists from the Muzeul Ţării Crisurilor in Oradea, excavated Lens 204 for three months in 1978. They extracted 10 tonnes of bone-bearing bauxite by blasting. The preparation of this material by Elisabeta Popa eventually yielded around 10,000 bones. Between 1978 and 1979, Florian Marinescu from the Institute of Geology, Bucharest, hand excavated additional bone-bearing bauxite. She recovered an additional 600 bones which now are housed by the Muzeul Ţării Crişurilor, Oradea. Between 1979 and 1983, additional small-scale hand excavations occurred. The Brusturi Mine closed in 1983 and reopened in 1994. In 1995 and 1996, additional research was conducted by a joint project between the Muzeul Ţării Crişurilor, Oradea, and the Department of Earth Sciences, University of Bristol. Afterwards, the mine closed and became flooded.

== Geology ==
The bone-bearing bauxite deposits of Lens 204 is an ancient cave fill associated with and derived from an extensive continental paleosol. This paleosol is part of an major subaerial unconformity separating underlying marine limestones of latest Jurassic age (Tithonian? to earliest Berriasian) and overlying middle-early Cretaceous (Barremian-Aptian) marine limestones.

Within the western Carpathians, the bauxitic cave and fissure fills and associated paleosols are collectively known as either the bauxitic formation or the Lower Bauxite Formation. The bauxite formation lies on an extensive karst surface that formed from the uplift and subaerial erosion of and tropical paleosol development in the underlying Cornet Limestones. The bauxite formation also includes detrital bauxite eroded from in situ soils and redeposited in fissures and caves.

In the center of lens 204, the basal layer of cave fill consists of 3 m (9.8 ft) bauxite lying on top of its floor. The basal layer is overlain by 3 m (9.8 ft) of red-brown boehmitic bauxite. The boehmitic bauxite consists of 30 cm (12 in) thick beds of structureless mud-grade bauxite alternating with 4 to 10 cm (1.6 to 3.9 in) thick beds of arenitic or arenitic-ruditic bauxite. The uppermost layer of the cave fill consists of 0.5 m (1.6 ft) of mottled yellow and red, laminated kaolinitic clay.

== Fauna ==
The Early Cretaceous fauna from the Bauxite of Cornet-Lens 204 is famous due to the unusual preservation of the bones of dinosaurs, pterosaurs, and proportively birds within bauxite. Because of the intense and prolongd chemical weathering required to form them, fossil are typically not preserved in bauxite deposits. In the rare cases that fossils are found within bauxite deposits, they are almost always very poorly preserved.

=== Pterosaurs ===
| Color key: Taxon / Reclassified taxon / Taxon falsely reported as present / Dubious taxon or junior synonym / Ichnotaxon / Ootaxon / Morphotaxon | Notes; Uncertain or tentative taxa are in small text; ~~crossed out~~ taxa are discredited. |

Dinosaurs of the Bauxite of Cornet-Lens 204
| Genus | Species | Location | Member | Abundance | Notes | Images |
|---|---|---|---|---|---|---|
| Eurolimnornis | E. corneti | Judetul Bihor | | | Formerly classified as a bird or theropod, actually a pterodactyloid pterosaur. | |
| Palaeocursornis | P. corneti | Judetul Bihor | | | Formerly classified as a bird or theropod, actually an azhdarchid pterosaur. | |

=== Dinosaurs ===
| Color key: Taxon / Reclassified taxon / Taxon falsely reported as present / Dubious taxon or junior synonym / Ichnotaxon / Ootaxon / Morphotaxon | Notes; Uncertain or tentative taxa are in small text; ~~crossed out~~ taxa are discredited. |

Dinosaurs of the Bauxite of Cornet
| Genus | Species | Location | Member | Abundance | Notes | Images |
|---|---|---|---|---|---|---|
| Archaeopteryx | Indeterminate | Judetul Bihor | | | Possible indeterminate avialan remains. | Iguanodon. |
| Theropoda | Indeterminate | Judetul Bihor | | | Formerly referred to Aristosuchus. | Iguanodon. |
| Bihariosaurus | B. baxiticus | Judetul Bihor | | | A possible relative of Camptosaurus. Formerly referred to Valdosaurus. | Iguanodon. |
| Hypsilophodon | Indeterminate | Judetul Bihor | | | | Iguanodon. |
| Ornithopoda' | Indeterminate | Judetul Bihor | | | | Iguanodon. |
| cf. ?Owenodon | Indeterminate | Judetul Bihor | | | | Iguanodon. |

=== Invertebrate Fossils ===
Along with the bones of vertebrates, invertebrate fossils also have been recovered from the Bauxites of Cornet-Lens 204. They include an unidentified charophyte stem, an tiny, undientified gastropod, two marine ostracods (Schuleridea mediocaudata and Asciocythere cf. circumdata), a terrestrial ostracod (Cypridea sp.), and an internal cast of small pulmonate gastropod. Also, other poorly preserved and unidentifiable fragmants of fragments of charophytes, an ostracod, a brachiopod and of a bivalve (possible caprotinid) have been reported from the Bauxite of Cornet - Lens 204.

== See also ==
- Paleontology – Study of past life through fossils
- List of fossil sites
- Geology of Romania
