= To'uri Cave =

Karst cave located on Mangaia, Cook Islands

- Interactive map of To'uri Cave
- Location: Mangaia, Cook Islands
- Coordinates: 21°54′30″S 157°56′30″W
- Depth: 3m
- Length: 489m

To'uri Cave is a karst cave located on Mangaia, Cook Islands in the Tava'enga district. The cave contains two running subterranean streams, one freshwater and the other salt. There is a 400-metre (1,300 ft) sump inside the cave which ends in a permanent sump.
