= Oneroa =

Oneroa may refer to:

- Oneroa, Cook Islands, located on Mangaia
  - Oneroa (Cook Islands electorate), a parliamentary electoral division
- Oneroa, New Zealand, located on Waiheke Island
