= Kei'a =

Traditional district of Mangaia, Cook Islands archipelago

Coordinates: 21°55′S 157°58′W

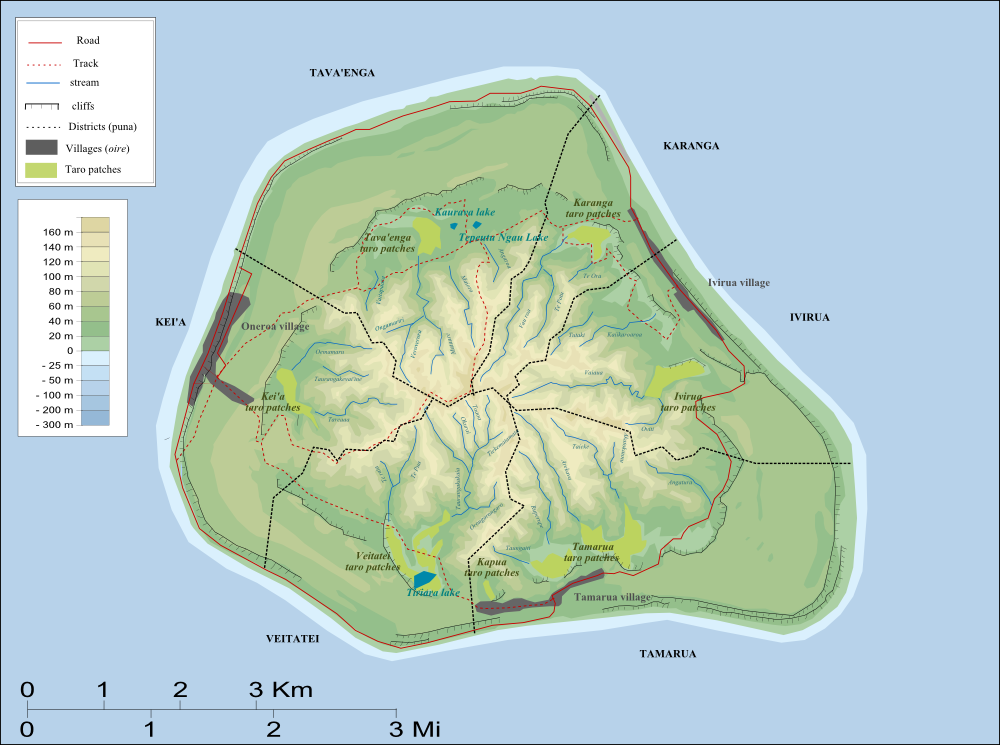
Districts of Mangaia

Kei'a (previously Te-apunavai) is one of the six traditional districts of the island of Mangaia, which is part of the Cook Islands archipelago. It is located on the west side of the island, to the south of the District of Tava'enga and west of Veitatei. The district was traditionally divided into 6 tapere:

1. Akaoro
2. Tapuata
3. Tongamarama
4. Te-inati
5. Rupetau-i-miri
6. Rupetau-i-uta

The major habitation is the village of Oneroa, which is home to over half of the island's population. The Auraka cave is also in this district.
