= Karanga (district) =

Coordinates: 21°54′22.83″S 157°54′11.15″W

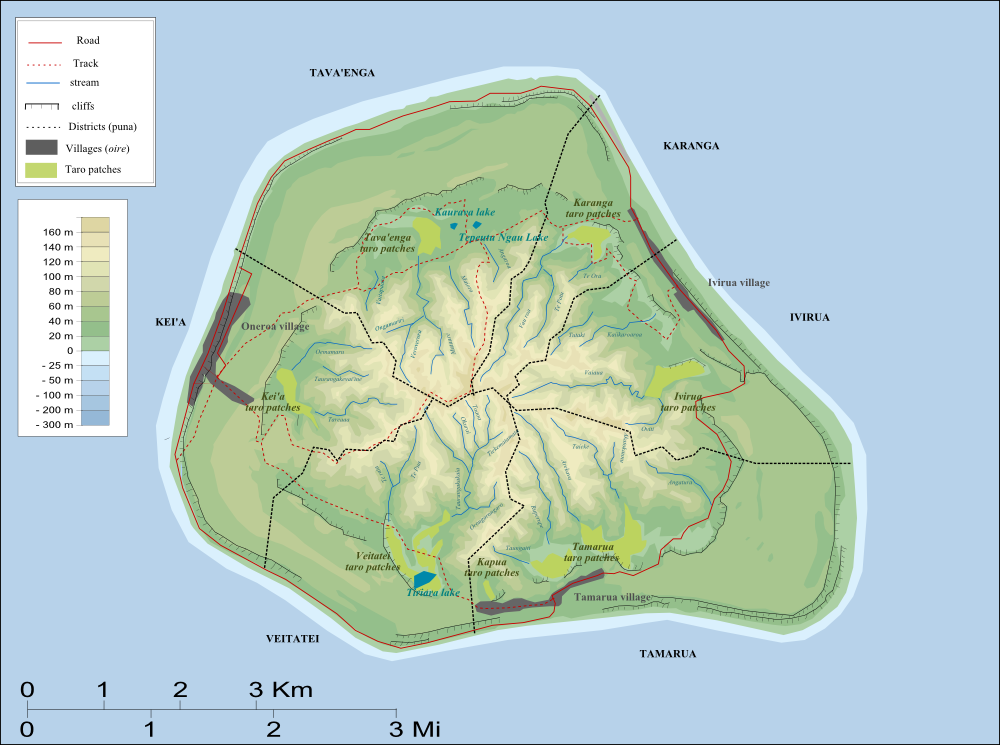
Districts of Mangaia

Karanga is the smallest of the six traditional districts of the island of Mangaia, in the Cook Islands archipelago. Karanga is located in the northeast of the island, to the east of the District of Tava'enga and northwest of the District of Ivirua. The district was traditionally divided into 5 tapere:

1. Kaau-i-uta
2. Kaau-i-miri
3. Teia-pini
4. Teia-poto
5. Teia-roa

Mangaia Airport is located in this district.
