= Geology of Romania =

The geology of Romania is structurally complex, with evidence of past crustal movements and the incorporation of different blocks or platforms to the edge of Europe, driving recent mountain building of the Carpathian Mountains. Romania is a country located at the crossroads of Central, Eastern, and Southeastern Europe. It borders the Black Sea to the southeast, Bulgaria to the south, Ukraine to the north, Hungary to the west, Serbia to the southwest, and Moldova to the east.

== Structural geology ==
Geologists subdivide Romania into several structural groupings:

- Scythian Platform: A platform spanning from eastern Romania to Crimea. Complex folding of Precambrian and Paleozoic basement rocks, slate, Ordovician sandstone, Silurian shale, and Devonian marl and sandstone. Platform cover rocks include Devonian limestone, Triassic basic detrital rocks, carbonates, Jurassic marl, and sand as well as Neogene shallow water sediments typical of the Carpathian Foreland.
- Moesian Platform: Southern part of the Carpathian Foreland, separated from the Scythian Platform by the North Dobogrea Orogen. Basement rocks are metamorphic and date to the Precambrian. It has four cycles of cover rocks, including detrital material from the Paleozoic, Triassic carbonate and shale, Jurassic-Cretaceous carbonates, and Eocene calcareous and detrital rocks.
- North Dobogrea Orogen: Separated from the Moesian Platform by the Peceneaga-Camena Fault. Includes several nappe features. The orogen extends offshore into the Black Sea continental plateau

=== Carpathian Orogen ===
The Carpathian Orogen folded belt lies 40 percent within Romania. It includes the Main Tethyan Suture (the deformed remains of the Tethys Ocean crust) between the Foreapulian Block and the continental margin of Europe. The inner zone of the orogen was deformed during the Cretaceous, while the outer zones were deformed during the Neogene. The inner zone is overlain by the Transylvanian and Pannonian basin Neogene molasse depressions and an additional molasse from the same period overlies the outer zone. Subduction produced two calc-alkaline magmatic arcs. The Eastern Carpathians consist of two main paleogeographic and structural units. From east to west, they are the inner crystalline zone and the outer Flysch zone.

== Geologic history ==
The Pan-African orogeny in the late Proterozoic impacted rocks in the Carpathian Forelands. In the Paleozoic, mobile areas formed south and west of the East European Platform, producing the Scythian Platform and the metamorphic rocks of the Carpathians.

=== Mesozoic (251-66 million years ago) ===
Rifting began in the early Mesozoic, in the North Dobogrea-South Crimea Aulacogen, likely related to the strike-slip movement of the Tornquist-Teysseire Lineament. Ocean rifting through the Triassic separated Europe from the Preapulian Block. As the spreading of the Tethys Ocean continued, the Moesian Platform was rotated to the northwest and North Dobogrea experienced compression. The crust began to shorten and compress in the area of the Carpathian Mountains, as the Transylvanian nappe formations were obducted onto the edge of the continent. Simultaneously, the North Dobogrea orogenic belt became part of the stable craton of the Carpathian foreland.

=== Cenozoic (66 million years ago-present) ===
In the early Paleogene, as the Tethys Ocean closed the Moldavian and Pienidian domains experienced flysch sedimentation and became deformed during the Miocene. Subduction of Tethys Ocean crust led to calc-alkalkine volcanism in the Senonian through the Paleocene and again in the Apuseni Mountains in the Neogene.

The opening of the Black Sea forced the increasingly deformed Moesian Platform to the west and molasse basins developed around the rising Carpathians in the Neogene.

== Natural resource geology ==
Some of the oldest resources in Romania are Archean-age Kyrvoirog-type iron ores in Dobogrea or others from the Paleozoic, situated in the Carpathians. Precambrian rocks also contain polymetallic copper, zinc and lead ores, and gold from metamorphic rocks. Gold-silver deposited hydrothermally in the Neogene, while porphyry copper formed through the Paleocene in the calc-alkaline arc of the South Carpathians and Apuseni Mountains.

Romania has oil and gas in Moesian and Scythian platform cover, coal in Carboniferous, Jurassic, Miocene, and Pliocene basins, Miocene salt deposits in the Transylvanian Depression and Carpathians, Lower Jurassic kaolin in the Apuseni Mountains, Jurassic marble, Neogene alabaster, and Oligocene-age amber.

== History of geological research ==
Geological research focused on Romania began in the early 19th century and expanded in the second half of the century led by Austrian and Hungarian geologists. L. Mrazec and I. Popescu-Voitesti wrote the first description of Carpathian structural geology in 1905. The Geological Institute of Romania was founded in 1906. To expand mining and petroleum extraction, a full mapping of the country was completed by 1958.
