= Veitatei =

Coordinates: 21°56′29.77″S 157°56′26.69″W

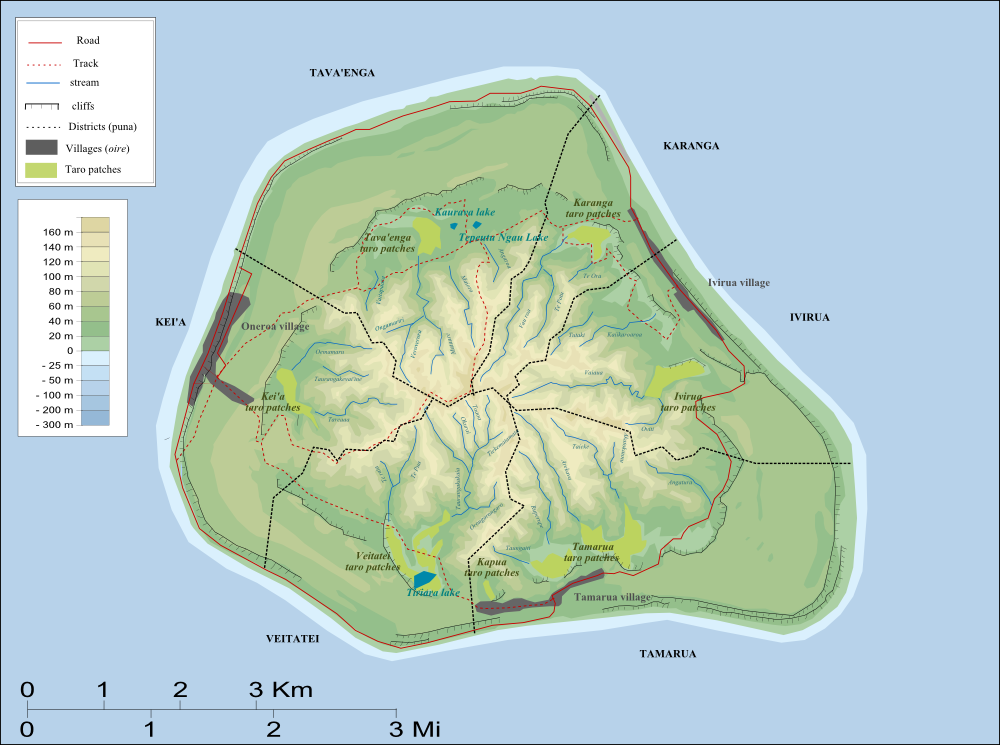
Districts of Mangaia

Veitatei (previously Patiki-enua-o-Rangi) is one of the six traditional districts of the island of Mangaia in the Cook Islands. It is located in the south of the island, to the east of the District of Kei'a and west of the District of Tamarua. The district was traditionally divided into 6 tapere:

1. Te-noki
2. Te-tuaroa (Te-tukono)
3. Te-tuapoto
4. Te-tarapiki
5. Kaikatu
6. Angarino
