= Tamarua =

District of Mangaia, Cook Islands

Coordinates: 21°57′1.12″S 157°54′27.13″W

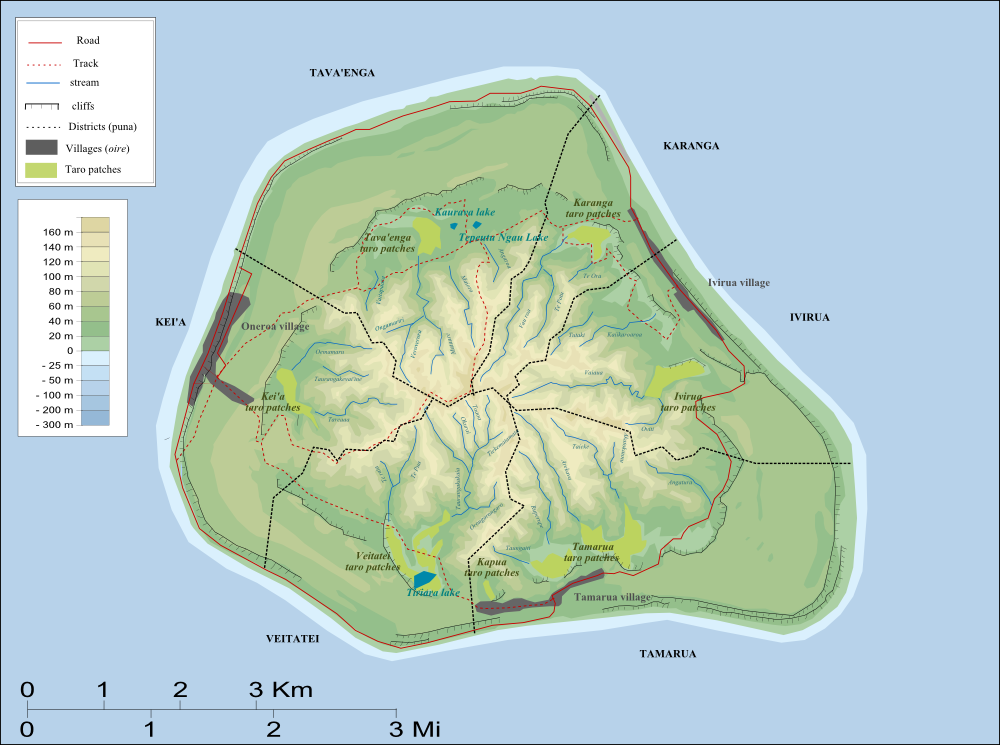
Districts of Mangaia

Tamarua (previously Mangonui) is one of the six traditional districts of the island of Mangaia, which is part of the Cook Islands archipelago. Tamarua is located in the southeast of Mangaia, to the south of the District of Ivirua and east of the District of Veitatei. The district was traditionally divided into 9 tapere:

- Maru-kore
- Poutoa-i-uta
- Poutoa-i-miri
- Akaea
- Te-vai-kao
- Angauru (Autaki)
- Vaitangi (Pukuotoi)
- Te-vai-taeta-i-uta
- Te-vai-taeta-i-tai
