= Kast =

Kast or KAST may refer to:

- Kast (furniture), a tall wardrobe-like Dutch chest with double doors. Often used as hope chests, these were constructed so as to partially dismantle for transport to the matrimonial home.
- KAST (AM), an AM radio station in Astoria, Oregon
- KLMY, a radio station (99.7 FM) licensed to Long Beach, Washington, United States, which held the call sign KAST-FM from January 2006 to January 2009
- The ICAO identifier for Astoria Regional Airport in Astoria, Oregon
- Kamusi Awali ya Sayansi na Tekinologia, a Swahili dictionary of terms in science and technology
- José Antonio Kast (born 1966), Chilean lawyer and politician, President of Chile; brother of Miguel Kast
- Miguel Kast (1948–1983), Chilean economist, brother of José Antonio Kast
- Kast, a streaming service that acquired Rabb.it, a similar streaming service, in July 2019.
- Korean Academy of Science and Technology, South Korea's highest academy of science which serves as a national think-tank
