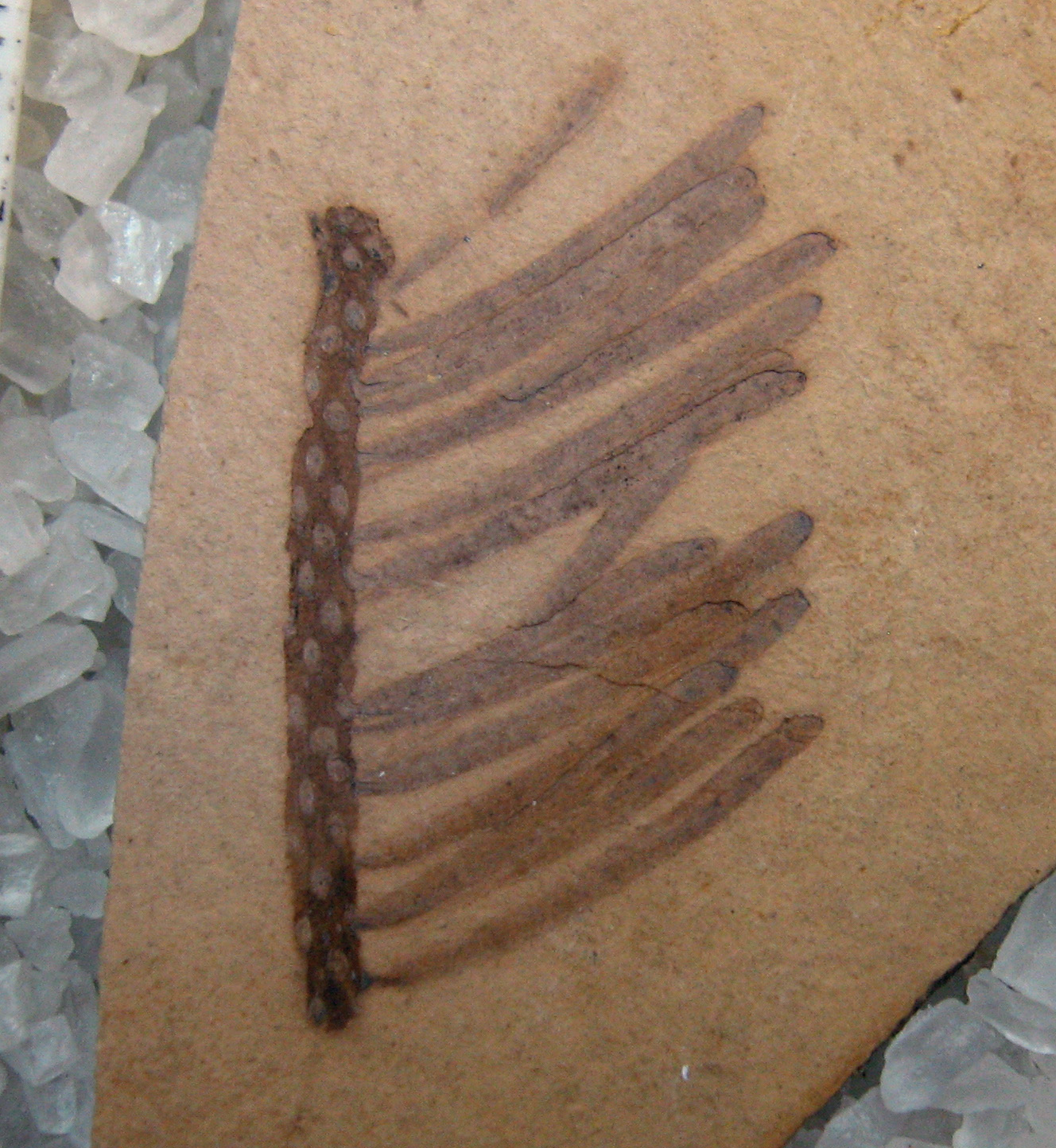
- Fossil Abies milleri foliage and axis

Scientific classification
- Kingdom: Plantae
- Clade: Embryophytes
- Clade: Tracheophytes
- Clade: Spermatophytes
- Clade: Gymnosperms
- Division: Pinophyta
- Class: Pinopsida
- Order: Pinales
- Family: Pinaceae
- Genus: Abies
- Species: †A. milleri

Binomial name
- †Abies milleri Schorn & Wehr

= Abies milleri =

Abies milleri Temporal range: Early Eocene (Ypresian)51.3–49 Ma

Species of conifer

Abies milleri, an extinct species of fir known from fossil remains found in deposits from the early Eocene Ypresian stage (around 51.3 to 49.5 mya) in Washington State, USA, is the oldest confirmed record for the fir genus.

== History and classification ==
The species was described from 81 fossil specimens collected from Burke Museum site number A0307 in Ferry County, Washington. The holotype specimen, number # UWBM 31299, and the eleven paratype specimens are currently deposited in the collections of the Burke Museum in Seattle, where they were studied and described by Howard E. Schorn and Wesley C. Wehr. Schorn and Wehr published their 1986 type description for A. milleri in the Burke Museum Contributions in Anthropology and Natural History, Volume 1. The specific epithet, milleri, was coined in honor of Charles N. Miller Jr for his contributions to the study and understanding of the conifer family Pinaceae. The studied specimens were excavated from the Tom Thumb Tuff member of the Klondike Mountain Formation in the city of Republic.

A. milleri has been placed in the fir genus Abies, which has between 48 and 55 species native to much of North and Central America, Europe and Asia occurring in mountains over most of the range. The characters used to separate extant species of Abies are based on the reproductive structures such as cone scales, wing seeds and bracts. The placement in Abies is based on the dorso-ventrally flattened leaves, and the circular leaf scars, which separate the organs from those of Pseudotsuga and Keteleeria. Within Abies, A. milleri shows similarities with A. kawakamii and A. chensiensis from Asia and with A. concolor and A. lasiocarpa of North America. A. milleri does not show traits which allow placement in any one of the genus Abies sections, however.

The 81 specimens studied for the A. milleri description included 40 cone scales, 21 wing seeds, 10 foliated axes, and two detached needles. Schorn and Wehr placed the different detached organ fossils in the same species based on a number of factors. Where visible, all the cone scales have bracts and are morphologically similar. The scales display impressions on the admedial surface of wing seeds that match the fossil seed dimensions. The needle arrangement is consistent on both foliated and defoliated axes, with attached needles matching isolated needles. All of the fossils occurred in the same stratigraphic layers.

== Description ==
The cone scales are up to 32 by 20 millimetres (1.26 by 0.79 in) and 1.25-2 times as long as wide, have a generally triangular to cuneate shape with the distal edge turned upwards and the stalk on half the length of the scale. Sometimes preserved with cone scales are the bracts which average 5 by 4 millimetres (0.20 by 0.16 in) and have a central accuminate flanked by thinner laminae. The wing seeds are up to 27 by 14 millimetres (1.06 by 0.55 in) and have a pterostegium which covers on average three-quarters of the seed. The narrow obovate seed is generally 12 by 4 millimetres (0.47 by 0.16 in), 1-1.5 times the length of the upper wing edge while the wing itself is widest in the distal half. Needles of A. milleri reach up to 38 millimetres (1.5 in) long, but have a width of only 1 millimetre (0.039 in) at the base. The leaf base is generally as wide to slightly wider than the leaf and round, with the leaf angled approximately 70 degrees upward from the attachment. Leaf scars on axes are circular to slightly oval, 1.5 by 2 millimetres (0.059 by 0.079 in), and show a vascular bundle scar in the center. Oval leaf scars are oriented with the long axis parallel to the length of the stem axis. While the scars show the leaves to be in a helical arrangement, the leaves would have had a flattened orientation on either side of the axis.
