= Lake Tiriara =

Lake in the Cook Islands

- Location within Pacific Ocean
- Location: Mangaia
- Coordinates: 21.951°S 157.929°W
- Basin countries: Cook Islands

Lake Tiriara is a lake located on the southern end of the island of Mangaia, a part of the Cook Islands. It is the largest freshwater lake in the island chain. Poor pollution management and agricultural processes in the area have put the biodiversity of the lake at risk.

== See also ==
- List of lakes in the Cook Islands
