= Ivirua =

Coordinates: 21°54′56.69″S 157°53′49.11″W

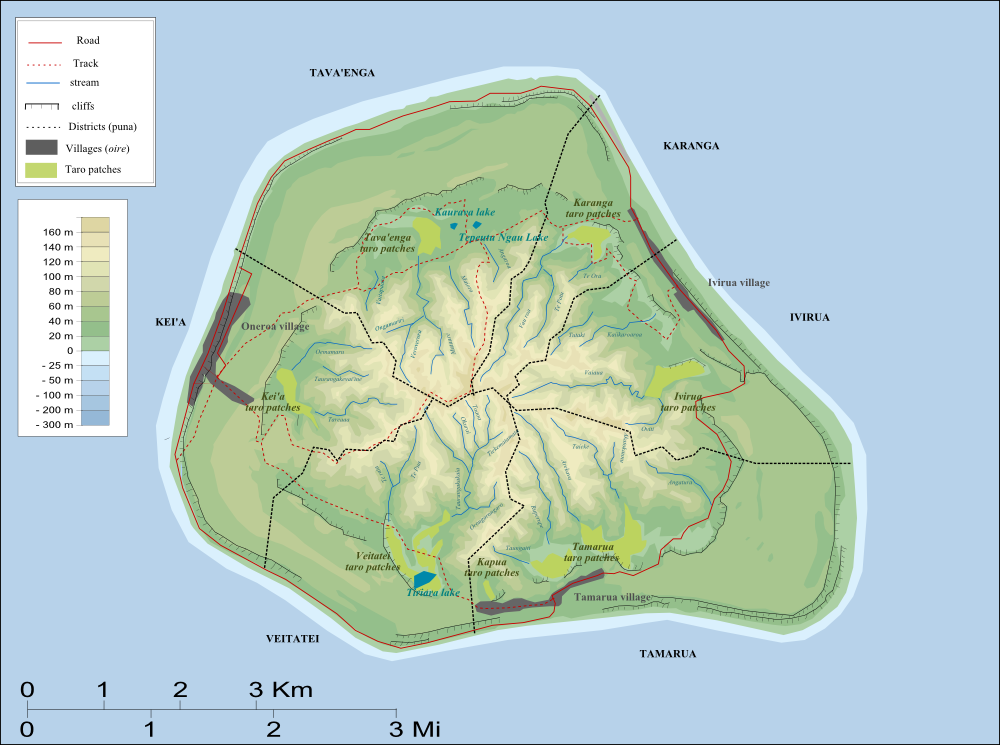
Districts of Mangaia

Ivirua is one of the six traditional districts of the island of Mangaia in the Cook Islands in the South Pacific Ocean. It is located in the east of the island, to the southeast of the District of Karanga and north of the District of Tamarua. The district was traditionally divided into 6 tapere:

1. Te-pauru-o-Rongo
2. Te-korokoro
3. Te-uturei
4. Te-ara-nui-o-Toi
5. Te-i'i-maru
6. Avarari

The major habitation is the village of Ivirua.
