= Oneroa, Cook Islands =

Coordinates: 21°55′S 157°58′W

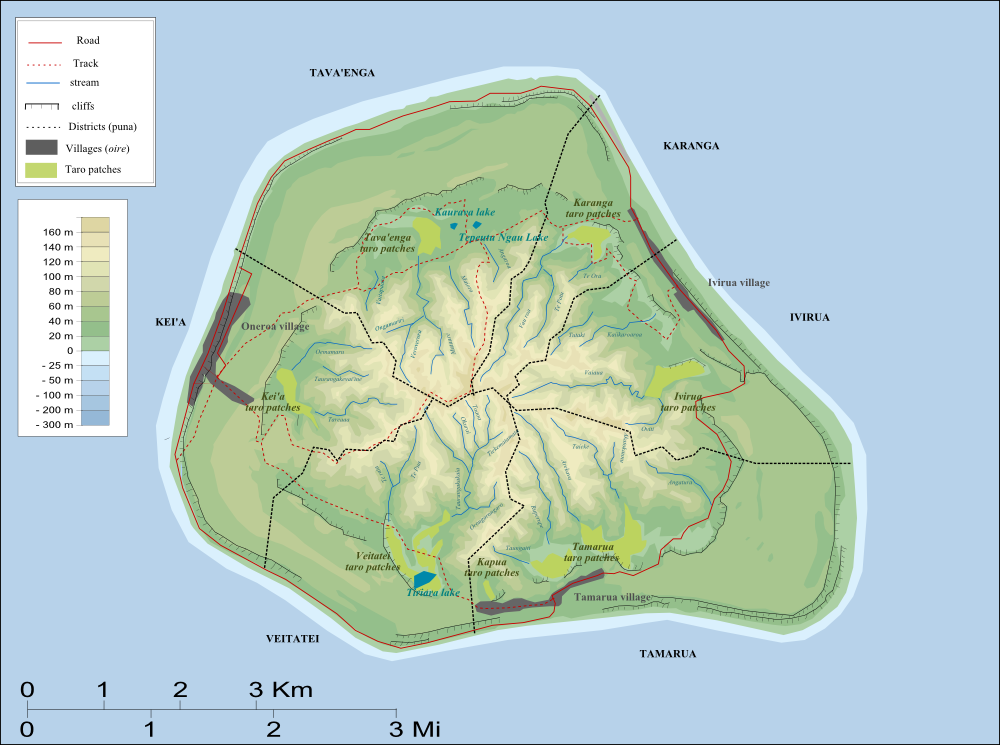
Oneroa is located on the west coast of Mangaia Island

Oneroa is the largest village on Mangaia Island, which is part of the Cook Islands archipelago. It is located towards the west of the island, in the district of Kei'a, and contains over half of the island's population. Oneroa is a contiguous village area that consists of three villages, Tavaʻenga, Kaumata and Temakatea.
