= Auraka =

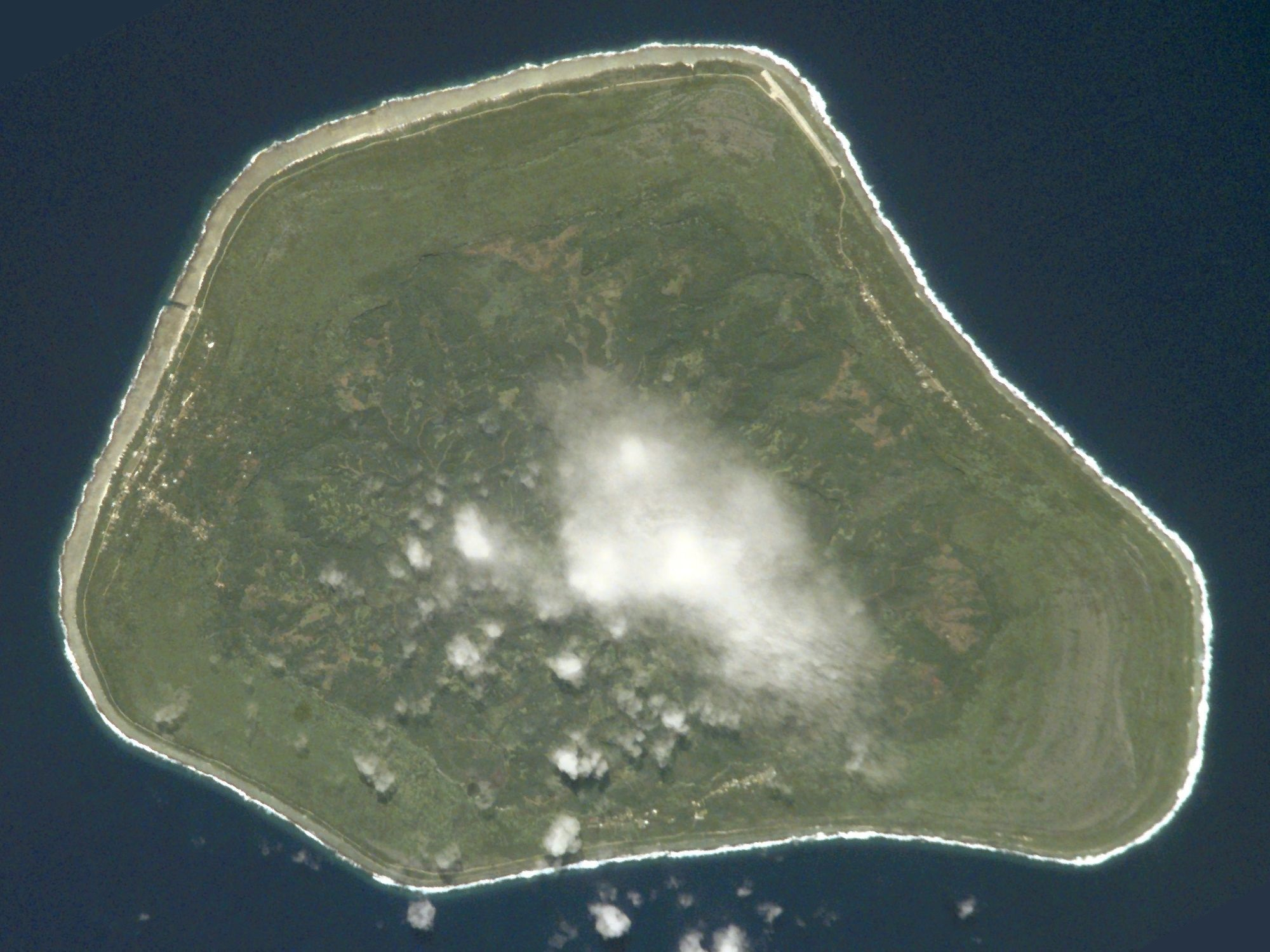
NASA picture of Mangaia Island.

Auraka is a locality in the Keia district, on the western side of the island of Mangaia in the Cook Islands. The Keia district contains at least two ancient burial caves, Kauvava and Piri Te Umeume, which were accessed by diagonal descents through boulder-strewn roof collapses from the top of the makatea, the limestone cliffs that form a concentric ring around the central basalt core of the island (Anton and Steadman 2003:133, 136). Gill, an early source for the mythology of Mangaia, noted a cave in Keia named Auraka, with one of its two entrances named Kauvava (1876a:71–79). However, according to Anton and Steadman (page 136), Gill's "description of the physical features of this cave does not match that of the cave currently known as Kauvava". Gill describes Auraka as a cave which is the 'last resting-place of the dead' (Gill 1876b:202, 243).

== Claims of mythological associations ==
In a few sources on the Internet, Auraka is erroneously described as a Polynesian god of death; these sources also claim that Auraka translates as 'all-devouring'. However, the word 'auraka' in Cook Islands Māori is a prohibitive adverb, with the approximate meaning 'do not'; it does not mean 'all-devouring'. The idea that Auraka is an all-devouring god of death appears to be a false assumption deriving from a misreading of Gill, where 'all-devouring' is his translation of the word 'maumau' in a line from a Mangaian song of mourning. The line that Gill translates as "From all-devouring Auraka" is O Rākā maumau e! (1846b:243). Gill comments on the same page that this is a reference to "Auraka, the last resting-place of the dead", and he makes no suggestion that Auraka is a god of death rather than a burial cave. 'All-devouring' is certainly possible as a poetic translation of 'maumau', the basic sense of which is 'to be wasteful'; in the song, it is clear that 'maumau' (and therefore 'all-devouring') is a poetic description, rather than a translation of the name.
