= Mangaia rail =

Mangaia rail Temporal range: Late Holocene

Scientific classification
- Kingdom: Animalia
- Phylum: Chordata
- Class: Aves
- Order: Gruiformes
- Family: Rallidae
- Genus: Gallirallus
- Species: †G. ripleyi

Binomial name
- †Gallirallus ripleyi Steadman, 1986

Extinct species of bird

The Mangaia rail (Gallirallus ripleyi) is an extinct species of flightless bird in the rail family, Rallidae.

== History ==
The rail was described in 1986 from subfossil bones of late Holocene age found in caves on the island of Mangaia, in the southern Cook Islands of West Polynesia. The cause of its extinction is ascribed to a combination of predation and habitat alteration following human settlement of the island and the introduction of exotic mammals.

== See also ==
- List of birds of the Cook Islands
