= Mangaia =

Second largest of the Cook Islands

Native name: A'ua'u
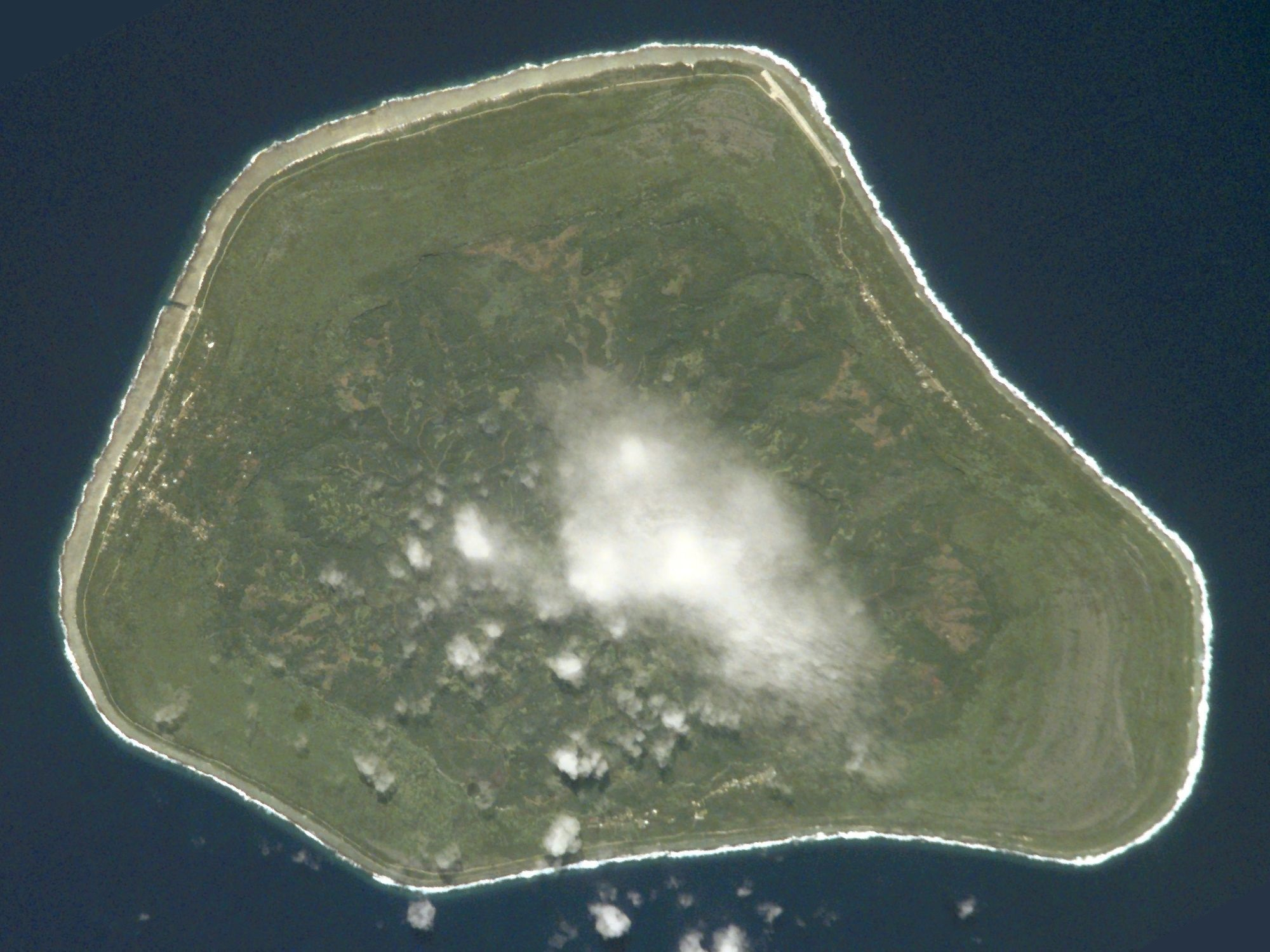
- NASA picture of Mangaia Island

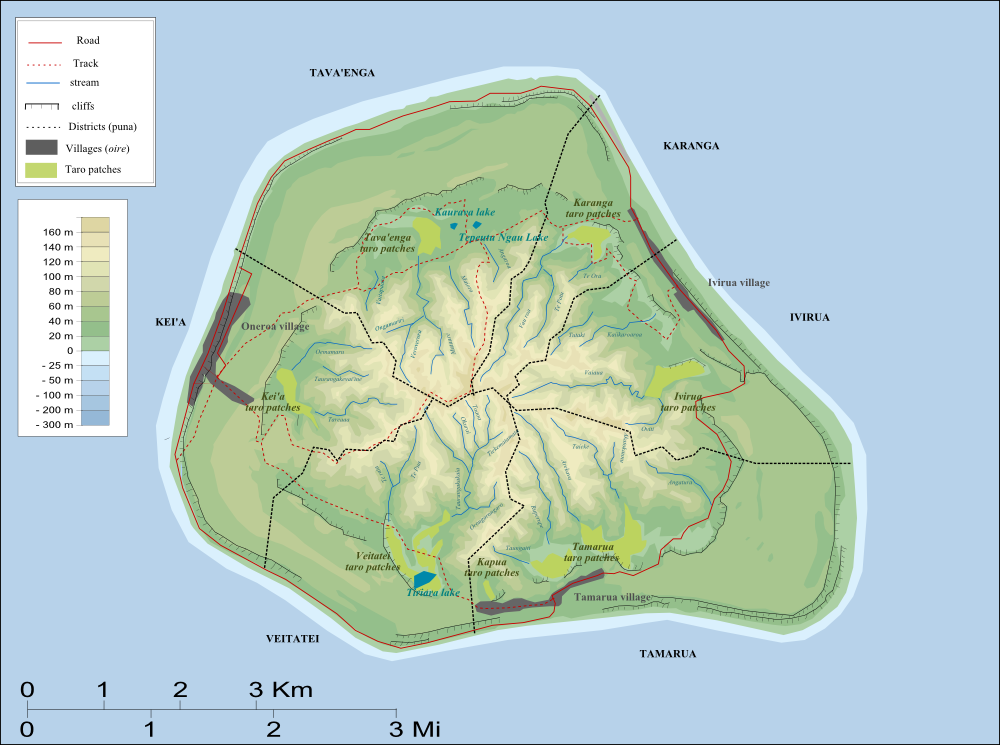
- Map of Mangaia Island

- Location of Mangaia Island in the Pacific Ocean

Geography
- Location: Central-Southern Pacific Ocean
- Coordinates: 21°55′S 157°57′W
- Archipelago: Cook Islands
- Area: 51.8 km^{2} (20.0 sq mi)

Administration
- Cook Islands
- Villages: Oneroa; Ivirua; Tamarua

Demographics
- Demonym: Mangaian
- Population: 471 (2021)

Mangaia (traditionally known as A'ua'u Enua, which means "terraced island") is the most southerly of the Cook Islands and the second largest, after Rarotonga. It is a roughly circular island, with an area of 51.8 square kilometres (20.0 mi^{2}), 203 kilometres (126 mi) from Rarotonga. Originally heavily populated, Mangaia's population has dropped by 75% since the 1980s, mainly due to the decline of the pineapple industry in the 1980s and a subsequent economic crisis in 1996.

== Geography ==
Originally known as A'ua'u ("terraced") or A'ua'u Enua ("terraced island"), it was named Mangaia (or Mangaianui-Neneva, "Mangaia monstrously-great") by Tamaeu, who came here from Aitutaki in 1775.

Geologists estimate the island is at least 18 million years old. It rises 4,750 m (15,600 ft) above the ocean floor and has a land area of 51.8 km^{2}. Surrounded by a fringing coral reef, like many of the southern Cook Islands, it is surrounded by a high ring of cliffs of fossil coral 60 m (200 ft) high, known as the makatea. The inner rim of the makatea forms a steep cliff, surrounding swamps and a central volcanic plateau. The interior of the island is drained by underground channels passing through the makatea, leading to extensive networks of caves which have been used historically as refuges and for burials.

The highest point is Rangi-motia, 169 m above sea level, near the centre of the island. Lake Tiriara is a body of fresh water in the south.

== History ==
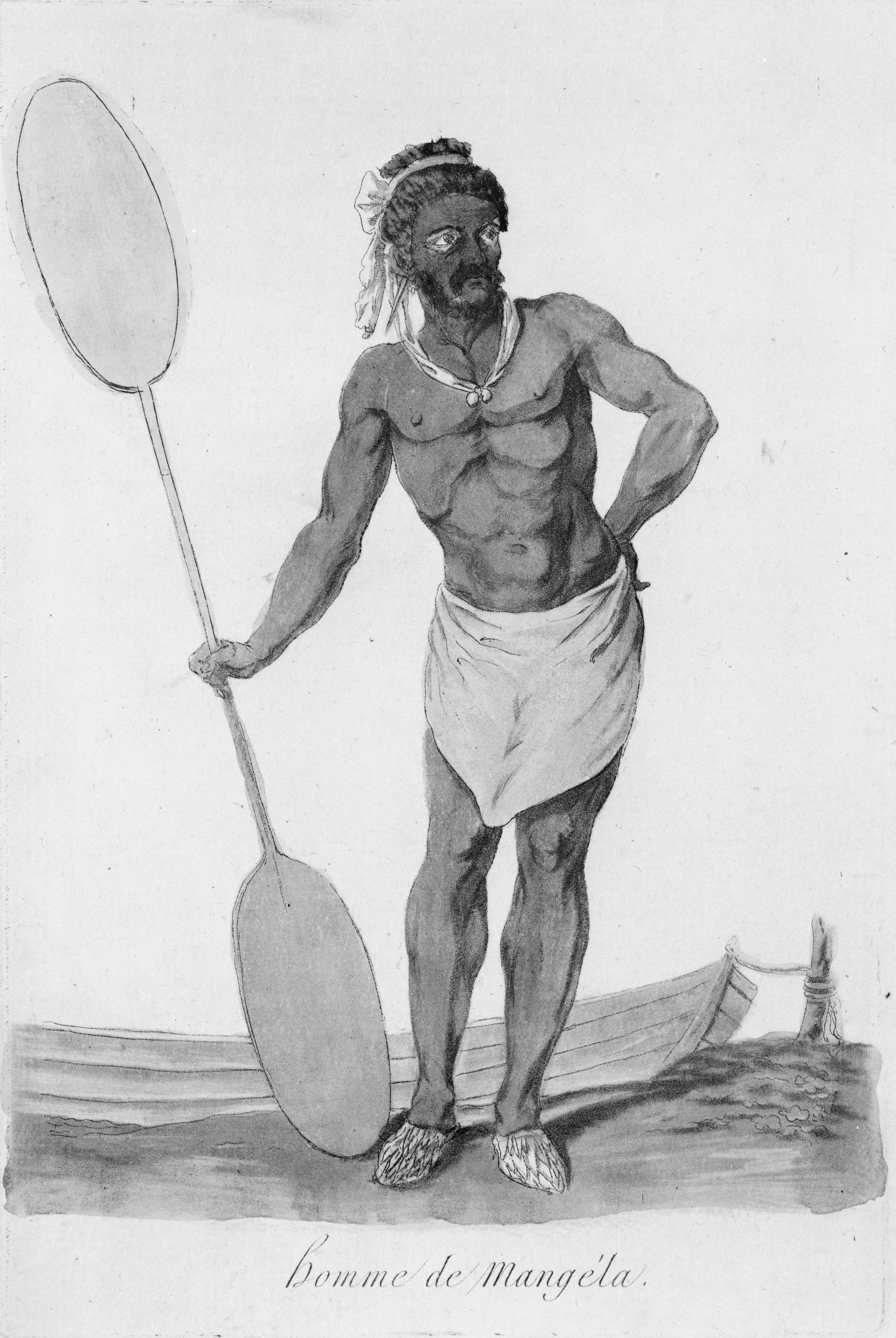
Portrait of a "man of Mangaia", c. 1796

Excavation of the Tangatatau Rockshelter shows that Mangaia was first settled around 1000 CE. According to oral tradition, the island was not discovered, but emerged from the underworld of Avaiki already populated. It was later further settled from Rarotonga, Aitutaki, Atiu, Tonga and Tahiti. Adze heads and basalt tools show that trading contact was maintained with Rarotonga, Samoa, and Raiatea in the Society Islands. While sweet potato was likely grown as a crop earlier in the Pacific, the archaeological site at the Tangatatau Rockshelter is currently the earliest recorded location showing sweet potato cultivation in Polynesia. Initially settlement was focused on the coastal villages, but by the 16th century it had shifted inland and inter-island trade had virtually disappeared. Oral histories of this era are of chiefs competing for land and status.

Europeans first came to the island on 29 March 1777 with the arrival of Captain James Cook. It was visited by two more ships, one of which was possibly HMS Bounty, before the arrival of John Williams of the London Missionary Society in 1823. Williams was unable to land, but in 1824 he returned and left behind two preachers from Taha'a, who began to convert the islands to Christianity.

Before the arrival of the missionaries, Mangaian society was characterised by a violent struggle between war-leaders competing for the title of mangaia (supreme temporal power), with ariki serving as priests rather than hereditary chiefs. The last mangaia, Pangemiro, died shortly after the missionaries' arrival, and the abolition of war under Christianity effectively froze the power structure and the division of land and titles in the state they had been in 1823. The Numangatini Ariki became dominant, with the title alternating between two branches of the family.

In 1888 Mangaia became a British protectorate as part of the Cook Islands Federation. In 1901 it was annexed by New Zealand. Post-annexation the island exported citrus, bananas and coffee to New Zealand, but exports ceased during the First World War. In 1946 pineapple growing was introduced and in the 1960s and 1970s Mangaia had a thriving export industry. The collapse of this industry in the 1980s and a subsequent economic crisis in 1996 has led to the island's gradual depopulation.

Mangaia was severely damaged by Cyclone Trina in December 2001. The slow-moving cyclone delivered eight days of heavy rain, resulting in the worst flooding in 50 years. Parts of the island were inundated with up to 2 m (6.6 ft) of water, and 95% of the taro crop and 60% of the livestock were destroyed. The resulting food shortage saw the IFRC distribute food to all of the island's residents. Due to the severity of damage caused by Trina, its name was later retired.

== Demographics and settlement ==
Historical population
Year	Pop.	±%
1906	1,531	—
1916	1,245	−18.7%
1926	1,249	+0.3%
1936	1,459	+16.8%
1951	1,830	+25.4%
1961	1,877	+2.6%
1966	2,002	+6.7%
1976	1,530	−23.6%
1986	1,229	−19.7%
1996	1,108	−9.8%
2001	744	−32.9%
2006	640	−14.0%
2011	572	−10.6%
2016	499	−12.8%
2021	471	−5.6%

Mangaia is divided into six districts (puna): Tamarua, Veitatei, Kei'a, Tava'enga, Karanga, and Ivirua. The districts are very nearly sectors meeting at the highest point near the center of the island, Rangi-motia. The districts are, as on some other islands of the Southern Cook Islands, further subdivided into 38 traditional sub-districts called tapere. In the Cook Islands constitution, however, the six districts are listed as tapere.

The capital is the village of Oneroa, on the west coast, containing about half the population. Oneroa is in fact a contiguous village area that consists of three villages: Tavaʻenga, Kaumata and Temakatea. All of Oneroa is located within Keiʻa District, including its northernmost village Tavaʻenga, which is not in Tavaʻenga district as one might assume by the name. There are three more villages, Tamarua in the south and Ivirua and Karanga in the northeast.

Mangaia's population was estimated at two to three thousand by John Williams in 1823. Despite an epidemic following European contact, and again in 1844, by 1846 its population had risen to 3,567. Emigration and disease had reduced the population to 2,237 in 1867, and 1,700 in 1892. In the twentieth century its population grew, peaking at 2,002 in 1966. The decline of the pineapple industry and subsequent economic collapse has led to further emigration and caused the population to drop by 75% from its peak, to 499 in 2016.

== Culture ==
Unlike other islands of the Southern Cook Islands, Mangaia has retained its traditional collective land tenure system. Land use is decided by each district's kavana, independently of the Land Court. It has also retained its own dialect of Cook Islands Māori, reo Mangaia.

One anthropologist, Donald Stanley Marshall, described Mangain residents as "the most sexually active culture on record" prior to European contact, with men "[spending] their late teens and 20s having an average of 21 orgasms a week (more than 1,000 times a year)."

== Economy ==
Mangaia's economy is heavily government-supported, with 50% of the workforce employed by the public-sector. Historically, its economy was based around agricultural production, which benefited from privileged access to the New Zealand market. The removal of this access combined with shipping interruptions destroyed the industry. Subsequent depopulation has left the island lacking in basic services, with no doctor or dentist. Current exports include eis necklaces made from the shells of the pupu snail.

Mangaia is connected to the rest of the Cook Islands by Mangaia Airport.

Previously powered by diesel generators, since 2018 it has been powered by a solar-battery power station.

== Ecology ==
=== Flora ===
The flora of Mangaia can be divided into five ecological zones. The pa tai, or coast, is dominated by coconuts, Pandanus tectorius, Barringtonia asiatica, and other scrub plants. The Rautuitui, or upland makatea, is native forest, dominated by indigenous species such as Elaeocarpus tonganus, Hernandia moerenhoutiana, and Guettarda speciosa, with coconuts, candlenuts, and Morinda citrifolia in areas near villages and tracks. The harsher parts of the makatea are covered in scrub, including pandanus and the endemic Geniostoma sykesii. The Puna (swampy lowlands) contain the island's most fertile soils, and are dominated by introduced and cultivate species such as taro, coconut, and Hibiscus tiliaceus. The Rautuanue (slopes) and maunga (mountain) are heavily modified, and covered in pineapple, coconut, scrub, ferns, and grass.

A first focused survey of Mangaia's lichen flora, based on field work in 2024, recorded 66 species in 37 genera and 22 families. Most were collected in coastal and littoral forest, largely because much of the island's central interior is now plantation forestry rather than indigenous vegetation. The most lichen-rich host trees were coconut (38 taxa), Hibiscus tiliaceus (21), Pandanus tectorius (15), and Fagraea berteroana (10), while only three taxa were recorded from coastal makatea. The survey added 43 new national records for the Cook Islands, indicating that Mangaia's lichen flora had previously been very poorly documented.

=== Fauna ===
The arrival of humans caused the extinction of local wildlife. Surviving land-based species include the insular flying fox, Pacific reef heron, Pacific black duck, spotless crake, mewing kingfisher, Cook reed warbler, as well as 12 species of seabirds. Introduced species include the red junglefowl, Polynesian rat, Oceania gecko and mourning gecko.

Birds described from subfossil remains that became extinct as a consequence of human settlement of the island and the introduction of exotic mammals include the Mangaia rail (Gallirallus ripleyi) and the Mangaia crake (Porzana rua).

The island has been designated an Important Bird Area (IBA) by BirdLife International.

== See also ==
- Auraka
- Tuanaki
- Mangaia swiftlet
