= Palaeocursornis =

Palaeocursornis Temporal range: Early Cretaceous, 143 Ma

Scientific classification
- Kingdom: Animalia
- Phylum: Chordata
- Class: Reptilia
- Order: †Pterosauria
- Suborder: †Pterodactyloidea
- Infraorder: †Eupterodactyloidea
- Superfamily: †Ornithocheiroidea
- Clade: †Azhdarchoidea
- Genus: †Palaeocursornis; Kessler & Jurcsák, 1986
- Species: †P. corneti

Binomial name
- †Palaeocursornis corneti (Kessler & Jurcsák, 1984 [originally Limnornis])

Synonyms
- Limnornis corneti Kessler & Jurcsák, 1984 (preoccupied); Eurolimnornis corneti (Kessler & Jurcsák, 1984); Palaeocursornis biharicus Kessler & Jurcsák, 1986

Genus of pterodactyloid pterosaur from the Early Cretaceous

Palaeocursornis is a dubious genus of avemetatarsalian, probably an azhdarchoid pterosaur.

== Discovery and naming ==
The only known species, P. corneti, was described in 1984 based on a single bone (MTCO-P 1637) interpreted as the distal part of a left femur, found in Early Cretaceous (Berriasian rocks (dating to around 143 mya) from a mine at Cornet near Oradea in northwestern Romania. It was initially assumed to be a flightless paleognathe bird, possibly a ratite, and later as a more primitive ornithuromorph or non-avialan theropod (Benton et al., 1997). In 2010, the holotype was considered too fragmentary and undiagnostic, so it was reclassified as a nomen dubium. Re-evaluation of the specimen suggested that it was not a femur at all, but the upper arm bone (humerus) of a pterodactyloid pterosaur with potential affinities to Azhdarchidae. In 2025, Thomas and McDavid suggested that Palaeocursornis is a dubious genus of tapejaroid.

The animal occurred on what at that time was an archipelago of volcanic and coral islands towards the east of the Piemont-Liguria Ocean. As the archipelago lay around 35°N latitude in a warmer, wetter climate than exists today, it was roughly similar to today's Caribbean or Indonesia. The habitat of Palaeocursornis was hilly, karstic terrain with numerous freshwater and/or brackish rivers, lakes and swamps.(Benton et al., 1997)

Initially, the bones were described as Limnornis corneti (Kessler & Jurcsák, 1984). However, that genus name had already been given to the curve-billed reedhaunter (L. curvirostris), an ovenbird. Moreover, the bones ascribed to the new taxon turned out to be from two different species, possibly not even closely related. Unfortunately, the new name to replace Limnornis corneti was referring to the material of the other species (which thus became Eurolimnornis corneti), creating considerable confusion since it assigned the same binomen (corneti) to both species. Subsequent attempts to redescribe the femur as Palaeocursornis biharicus were invalid as far as the binomen is concerned, but at least established a correct genus (Kessler & Jurcsák, 1986). The currently valid name, Palaeocursornis corneti, was first mentioned by Jurcsák & Kessler in 1985, but it was a nomen nudum at that time and only became valid the following year, when the current genus was validly established (albeit with an unnecessarily synonymous species name), as mentioned above. This confusing history of synonymy was clarified by Bock & Bühler (1996):

Synonyms

- Limnornis corneti Kessler & Jurcsák 1984
- "Palaeocursornis corneti" Kessler & Jurcsák 1985 (nomen nudum)
- "Palaeocursornis biharicus" Kessler & Jurcsák 1985 (nomen nudum)
- Palaeocursornis biharicus Kessler & Jurcsák 1986

== See also ==
- List of pterosaur genera
- Timeline of pterosaur research
