= Tavaʻenga =

Coordinates: 21°54′24.89″S 157°55′51.91″W

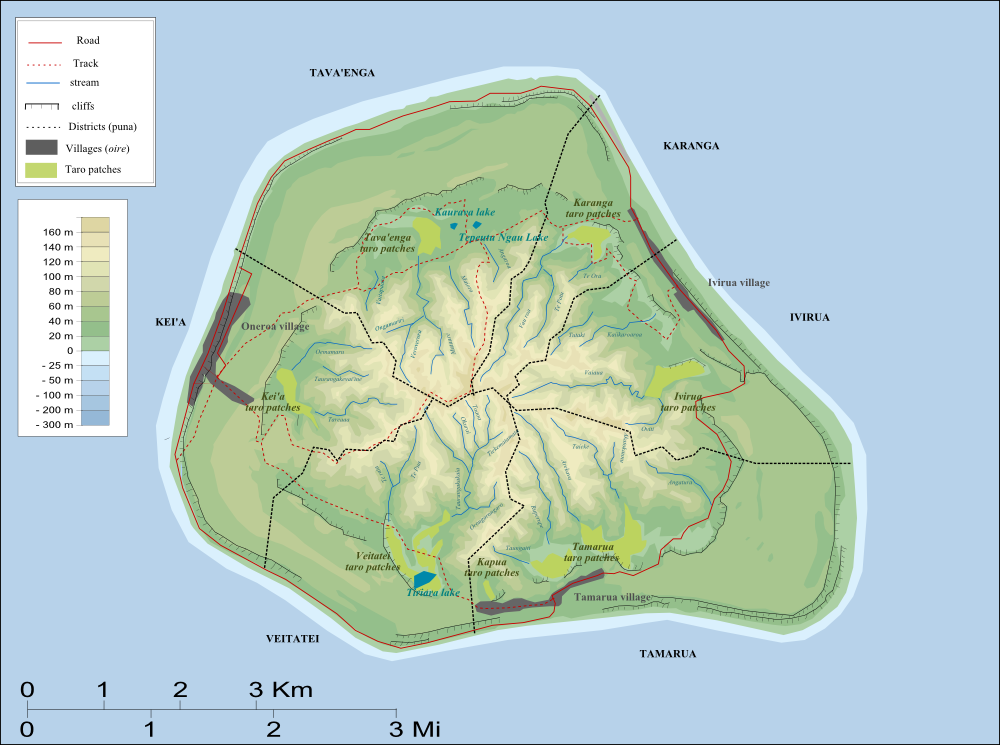
Districts of Mangaia

Tava'enga (previously Te-kura) is one of the six traditional districts of the island of Mangaia in the Cook Islands, in the South Pacific Ocean. It is located in the north of the island, to the west of the District of Karanga and east of the District of Kei'a. The district was traditionally divided into six tapere:

- Te-pueu
- Te-mati-o-Pa'eru
- Au-ruia
- Maro
- Te-rupe
- Ta'iti
