= Eurolimnornis =

Eurolimnornis Temporal range: Early Cretaceous, ~143 Ma

Scientific classification
- Kingdom: Animalia
- Phylum: Chordata
- Class: Reptilia
- Order: †Pterosauria
- Suborder: †Pterodactyloidea
- Family: †Eurolimnornithidae; Kessler & Jurcsák, 1986
- Genus: †Eurolimnornis; Kessler & Jurcsák, 1986
- Species: †E. corneti

Binomial name
- †Eurolimnornis corneti Kessler & Jurcsák, 1986

Genus of pterodactyloid pterosaur from the Early Cretaceous

Eurolimnornis is a dubious genus of avemetatarsalian, probably a pterosaur, from the Early Cretaceous.

== Discovery and naming ==
The only known species E. corneti was originally identified as a primitive but essentially modern bird (or even as an early neognathe ancestral to the grebes), although alternative theories later suggested that it was a non-avialan theropod or pterosaur. In 2010, the holotype was considered too fragmentary and undiagnostic, so it was reclassified as a nomen dubium. The identification as a pterosaur was supported by a re-evaluation of the fossil remains published in 2012.

The holotype and only material known to date (MTCO-P 7896) is a distal fragment of the right humerus, which was at first ascribed to the same species as the specimen of Palaeocursornis corneti, a possible synonym also originally identified as a bird.

The remains were found in Berriasian deposits (around 143 mya) at Cornet near Oradea, Romania. Eurolimnornis occurred on what was then an archipelago of volcanic and coral islands towards the east of the Piemont-Liguria Ocean. Its habitat was hilly, karstic terrain with numerous freshwater and/or brackish rivers, lakes and swamps. As this archipelago lay around 35°N latitude in a warmer, wetter climate than exists today, it was roughly similar to today's Caribbean or Indonesia.

== See also ==
- List of pterosaur genera
- Timeline of pterosaur research
