= List of the Mesozoic life of Texas =

This list of the Mesozoic life of Texas contains the various prehistoric life-forms whose fossilized remains have been reported from within the US state of Texas and are between 252.17 and 66 million years of age.

== A ==
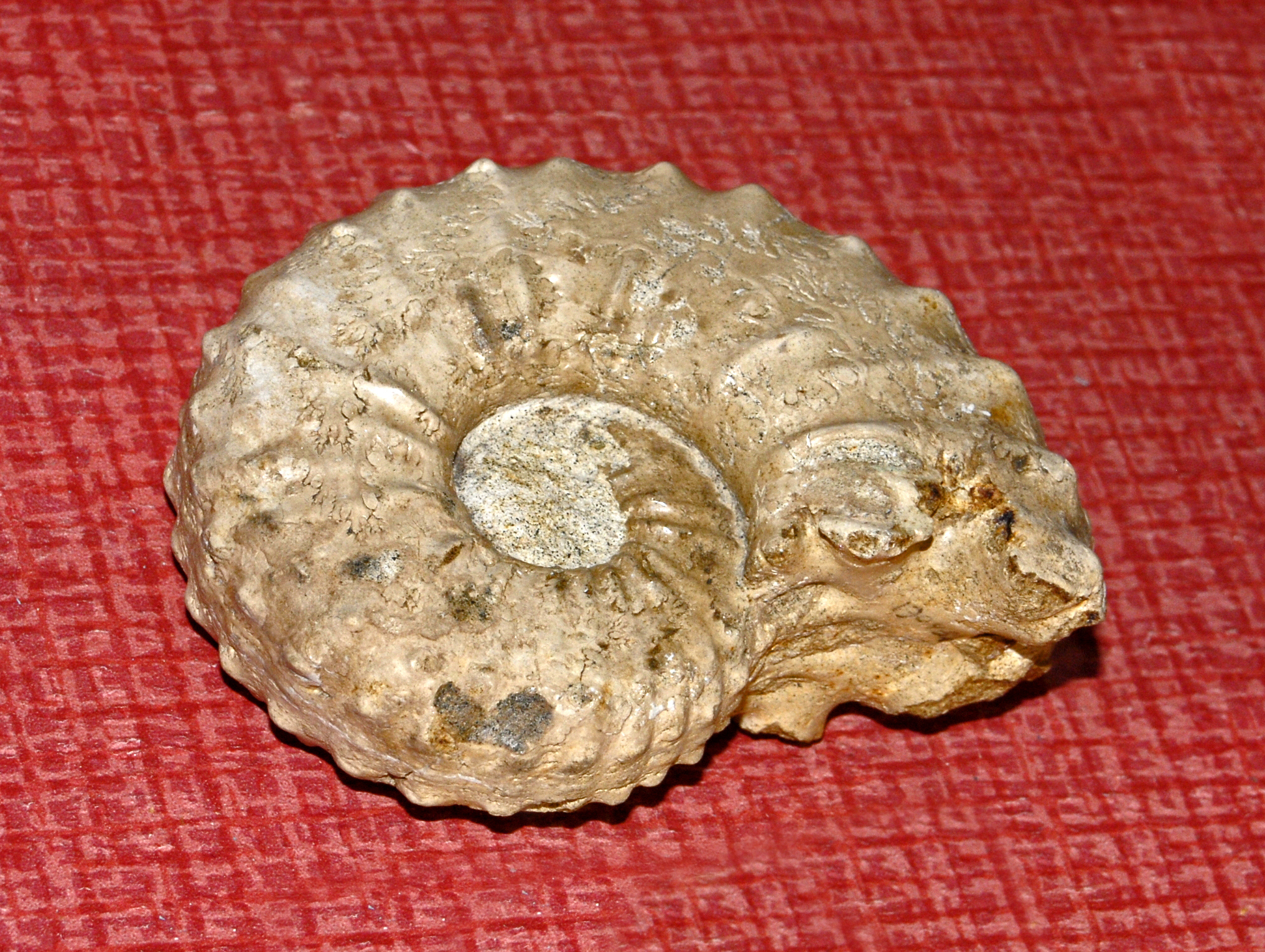
- Fossilized shell of the Early-Late Cretaceous ammonoid cephalopod Acanthoceras
  †Acanthoceras
  - †Acanthoceras adkinsi
  - †Acanthoceras amphibolum
  - †Acanthoceras barcusi
  - †Acanthoceras eulessanum
  - †Acanthoceras johnsonanum
  - †Acanthoceras tarrantense
    - †Acanthoceras tarrantense nitidum
  - †Acanthoceras wintoni
  - †Acanthoceras worthense
- Acesta
  - †Acesta sayeri
  - †Acesta sayrei
- Acila
  - †Acila chicotana
- Acirsa
  - †Acirsa flexicostata – tentative report
- Acmaea
  - †Acmaea occidentalis
  - †Acmaea pilleolus
- †Acompsoceras
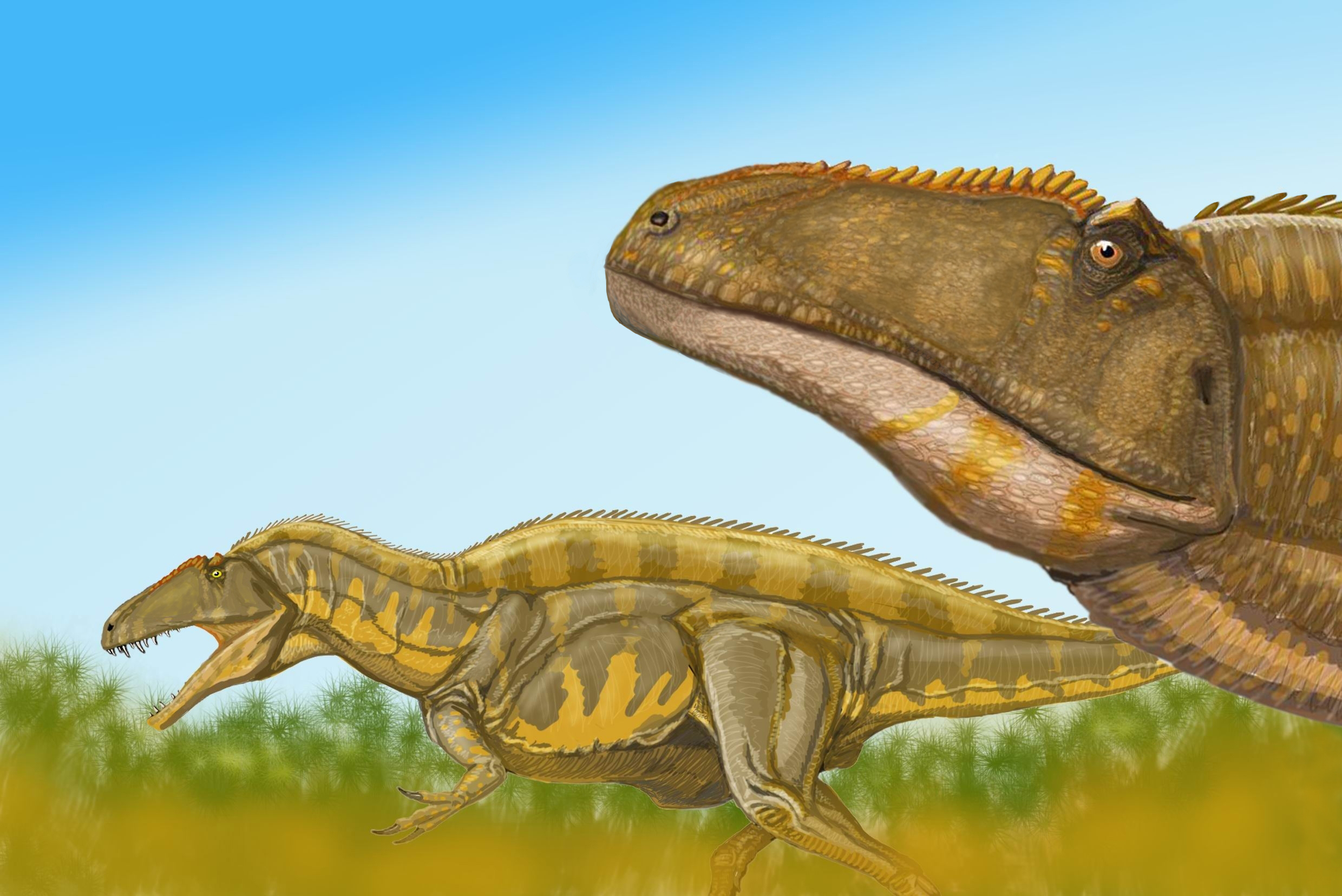
- Life restoration of the Early Cretaceous theropod dinosaur Acrocanthosaurus
  †Acrocanthosaurus
  - †Acrocanthosaurus atokensis
- †Acrosmilia
- Acteon
  - †Acteon nitidus – tentative report
  - †Acteon throckmortoni
- †Acteonella
  - †Acteonella delgadoi
  - †Acteonella pecosensis
  - †Acteonella sublaevis – or unidentified comparable form
- †Actinacis
  - †Actinacis valverdensis – type locality for species
- †Actinastrea
  - †Actinastrea guadalupae
- †Actinostreon
  - †Actinostreon gregareum
- †Acutostrea
  - †Acutostrea plumosa
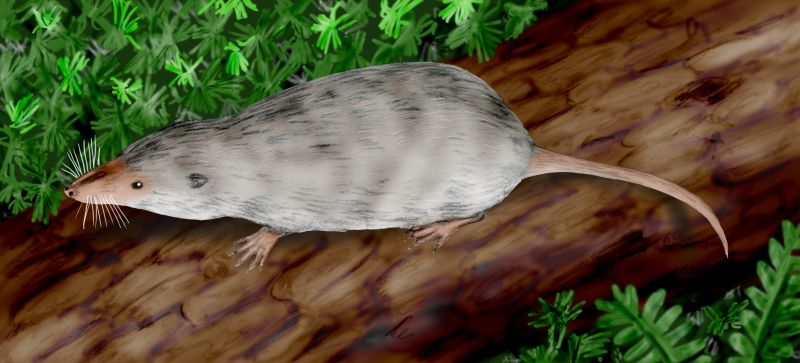
- Life restoration of the Late Triassic synapsid (mammal precursor) Adelobasileus
  †Adelobasileus – type locality for genus
  - †Adelobasileus cromptoni – type locality for species
- †Adinodon
  - †Adinodon pattersoni – type locality for species
- †Adkinsella – type locality for genus
  - †Adkinsella edwardsensis – type locality for species
- †Adkinsia
  - †Adkinsia bosquensis – type locality for species
  - †Adkinsia knikerae – type locality for species
- †Adocus
- †Aenona
  - †Aenona eufaulensis
- †Aetodactylus – type locality for genus
  - †Aetodactylus halli – type locality for species
- †Agerostrea
  - †Agerostrea mesenterica
- †Aguileria
  - †Aguileria cumminsi
- †Agujaceratops
  - †Agujaceratops mariscalensis – type locality for species
- †Akera
  - †Akera constricta
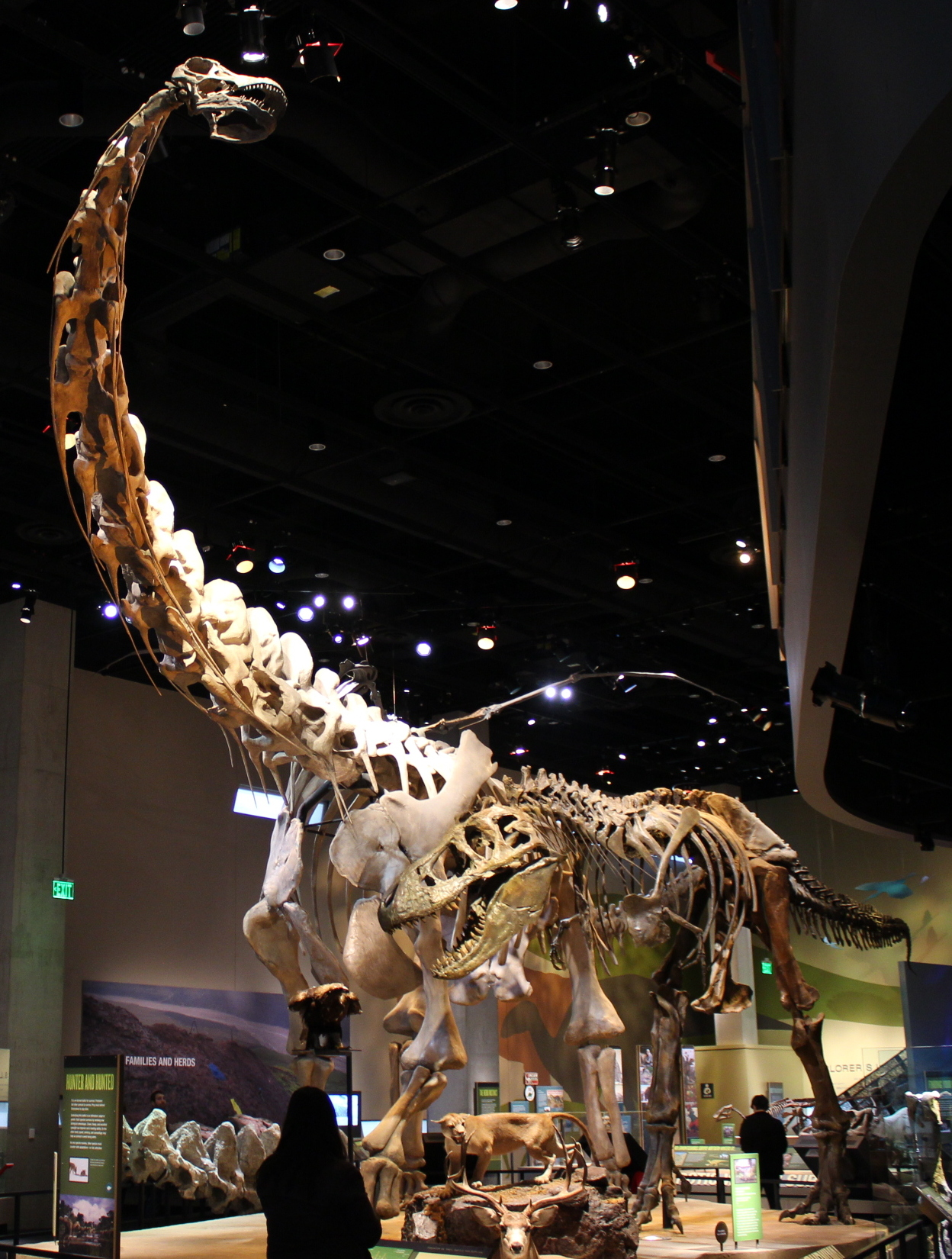
- Alamosaurus
  †Alamosaurus
  - †Alamosaurus sanjuanensis
- †Albanerpeton
  - †Albanerpeton arthridion – type locality for species
  - †Albanerpeton gracilis
  - †Albanerpeton nexuosus
- †Aliofusus
  - †Aliofusus balaniformis
  - †Aliofusus reagani
  - †Aliofusus reagani subtilis
  - †Aliofusus reagani tumidus
- †Aliomactra
  - †Aliomactra compressa
- †Alkaidia – type locality for genus
  - †Alkaidia sumralli – type locality for species
- †Allocrioceras
  - †Allocrioceras annulatum
  - †Allocrioceras dentonense
  - †Allocrioceras larvatum
- Alnus
  - †Alnus trina
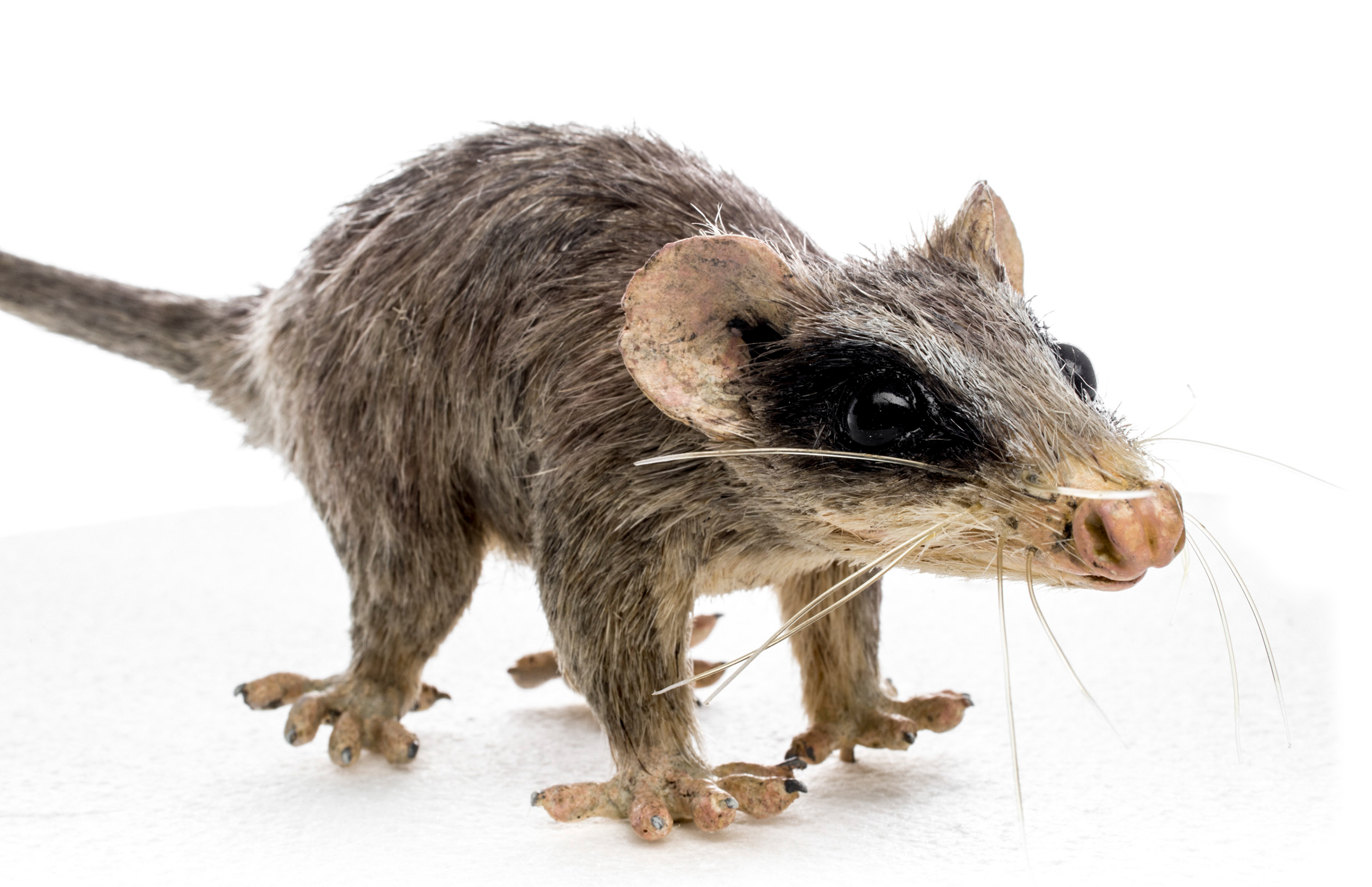
- Restorative model of the Late Cretaceous mammal Alphadon
  †Alphadon
  - †Alphadon halleyi – or unidentified comparable form
  - †Alphadon perexiguus – type locality for species
- †Altairia – type locality for genus
  - †Altairia wintoni
- †Amaurellina
  - †Amaurellina stephensoni
- †Ambigostrea
  - †Ambigostrea tecticosta
- †Ambrosea
  - †Ambrosea nitida
- Ammobaculites
  - †Ammobaculites subcretaceous
  - †Ammobaculites subcretaceus
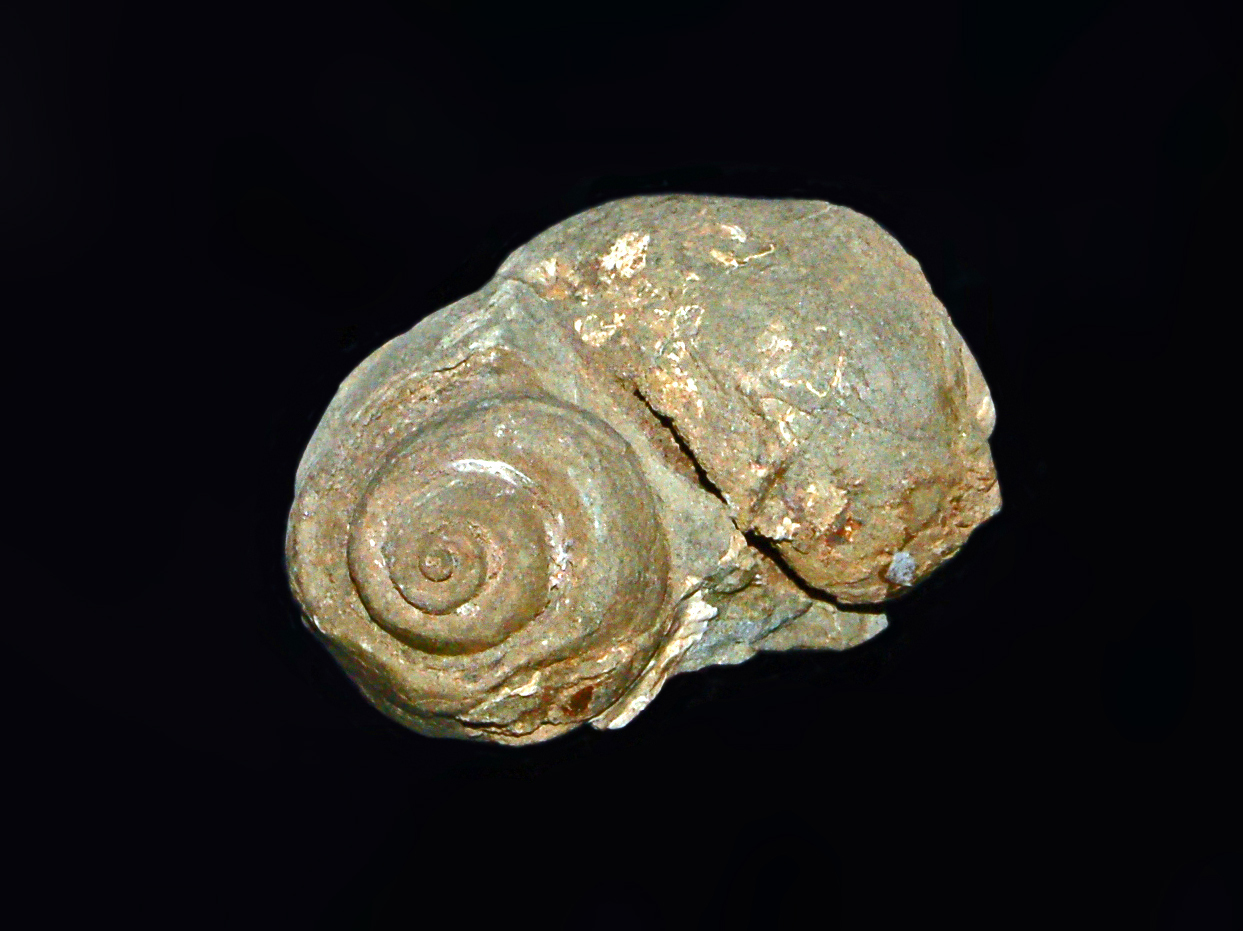
- Fossilized shell of the Jurassic-Miocene sea snail Ampullina
  †Ampullina – or unidentified comparable form
  - †Ampullina abnormalis
  - †Ampullina densatus
  - †Ampullina lirata
- Amuletum
  - †Amuletum boylei
  - †Amuletum curvocostatum
  - †Amuletum venustum
- Amusium
  - †Amusium danei – tentative report
- †Anacolosidites
- †Anaklinoceras
  - †Anaklinoceras reflexum
- †Anatimya
  - †Anatimya anteradiata
  - †Anatimya anteradiata texana
  - †Anatimya eulessana
  - †Anatimya longula
- †Anchura
  - †Anchura bexarensis
  - †Anchura caddoensis
  - †Anchura campbelli
  - †Anchura elegans
  - †Anchura hoggi
  - †Anchura lamari
  - †Anchura modesta
  - †Anchura noackensis
  - †Anchura noakensis – tentative report
  - †Anchura substriata
  - †Anchura turricula
  - †Anchura whitneyensis
- †Ancilla
  - †Ancilla acutula
- †Angistorhinus
  - †Angistorhinus alticephalus – type locality for species
  - †Angistorhinus grandis
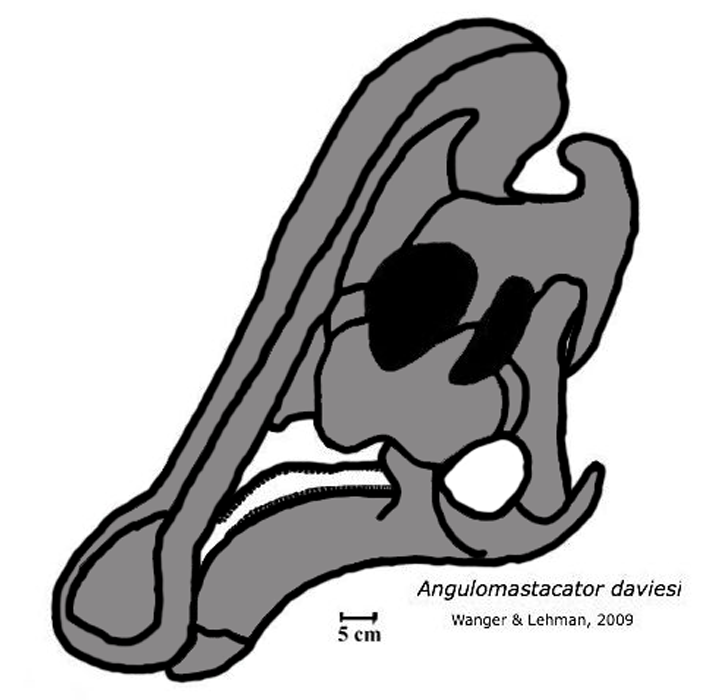
- Reconstructive illustration of a fossilized skull of the Late Cretaceous duck-billed dinosaur Angulomastacator
  †Angulomastacator – type locality for genus
  - †Angulomastacator daviesi – type locality for species
- †Anisoceras
  - †Anisoceras armatum
  - †Anisoceras perarmatum
- †Anisomyon
  - †Anisomyon borealis – tentative report
  - †Anisomyon haydeni
- †Anomalina
  - †Anomalina petita
  - †Anomalina torcerensis
- †Anomalofusus
  - †Anomalofusus bellulus
  - †Anomalofusus lemniscatus
- Anomia
  - †Anomia argentaria
  - †Anomia mexicana
  - †Anomia ornata
  - †Anomia ponticulana
  - †Anomia tellinoides
- †Anomoeodus
- †Anomotodon
  - †Anomotodon toddi – type locality for species
- †Antillocaprina
- †Apachesaurus
  - †Apachesaurus gregorii
- †Aphrodina
  - †Aphrodina navarroana
  - †Aphrodina tippana
- Aplousina
- †Apsgnathus – type locality for genus
  - †Apsgnathus triptodon – type locality for species
- †Aquilarhinus – type locality for genus
  - †Aquilarhinus palimentus – type locality for species
- Arca
  - †Arca martindalensis
  - †Arca pergracilis
  - †Arca rostellata
  - †Arca securiculata
- Architectonica
  - †Architectonica voragiformis
- Arcopsis
  - †Arcopsis nolani
- †Arctostrea
  - †Arctostrea falacata
- †Areopsammia – type locality for genus
  - †Areopsammia bakerae – type locality for species
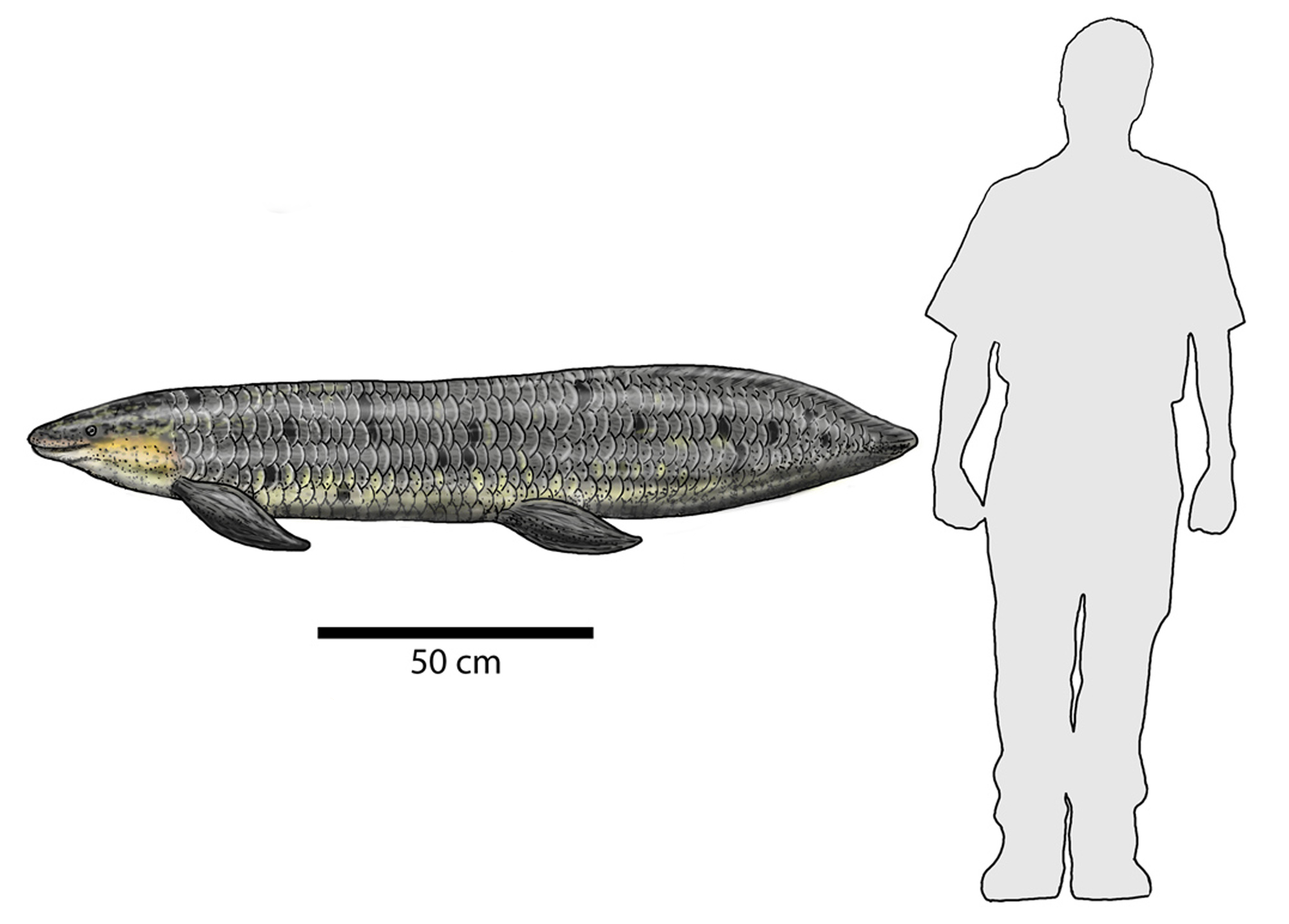
- Restoration of the Late Triassic lungfish Arganodus with an anachronistic human to scale
  †Arganodus
  - †Arganodus dorotheae – type locality for species
- Arrhoges
  - †Arrhoges cibolensis
  - †Arrhoges ciboloensis
  - †Arrhoges lobata media
  - †Arrhoges plenocosta
- †Asciocythere
  - †Asciocythere rotunda
- †Aspidoceras
  - †Aspidoceras laevigatum
- †Astacodes
  - †Astacodes davisi
  - †Astacodes maxwelli
- †Astandes
- Astarte
  - †Astarte culebrensis
  - †Astarte malonensis
- †Astartemya
  - †Astartemya fentressensis
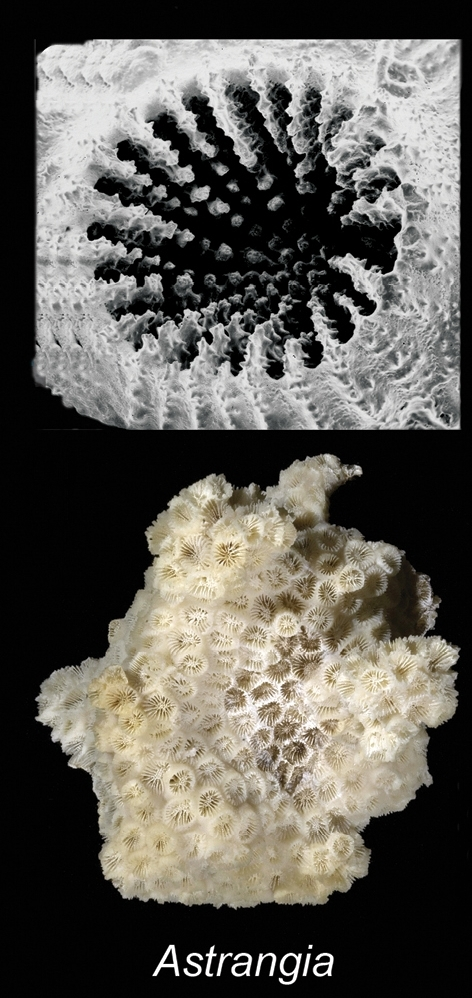
- Electron micrograph and gross view of an Astrangia stony coral
  Astrangia
  - †Astrangia cretacea
  - †Astrangia lamarensis – type locality for species
- Astreopora – tentative report
  - †Astreopora leightoni – type locality for species
- †Astrocoenia
  - †Astrocoenia budaensis – type locality for species
  - †Astrocoenia nidiformis
  - †Astrocoenia scyphoidea – type locality for species
- †Astroconodon – type locality for genus
  - †Astroconodon denisoni – type locality for species
- †Astrocratis – type locality for genus
  - †Astrocratis acutispina – type locality for species
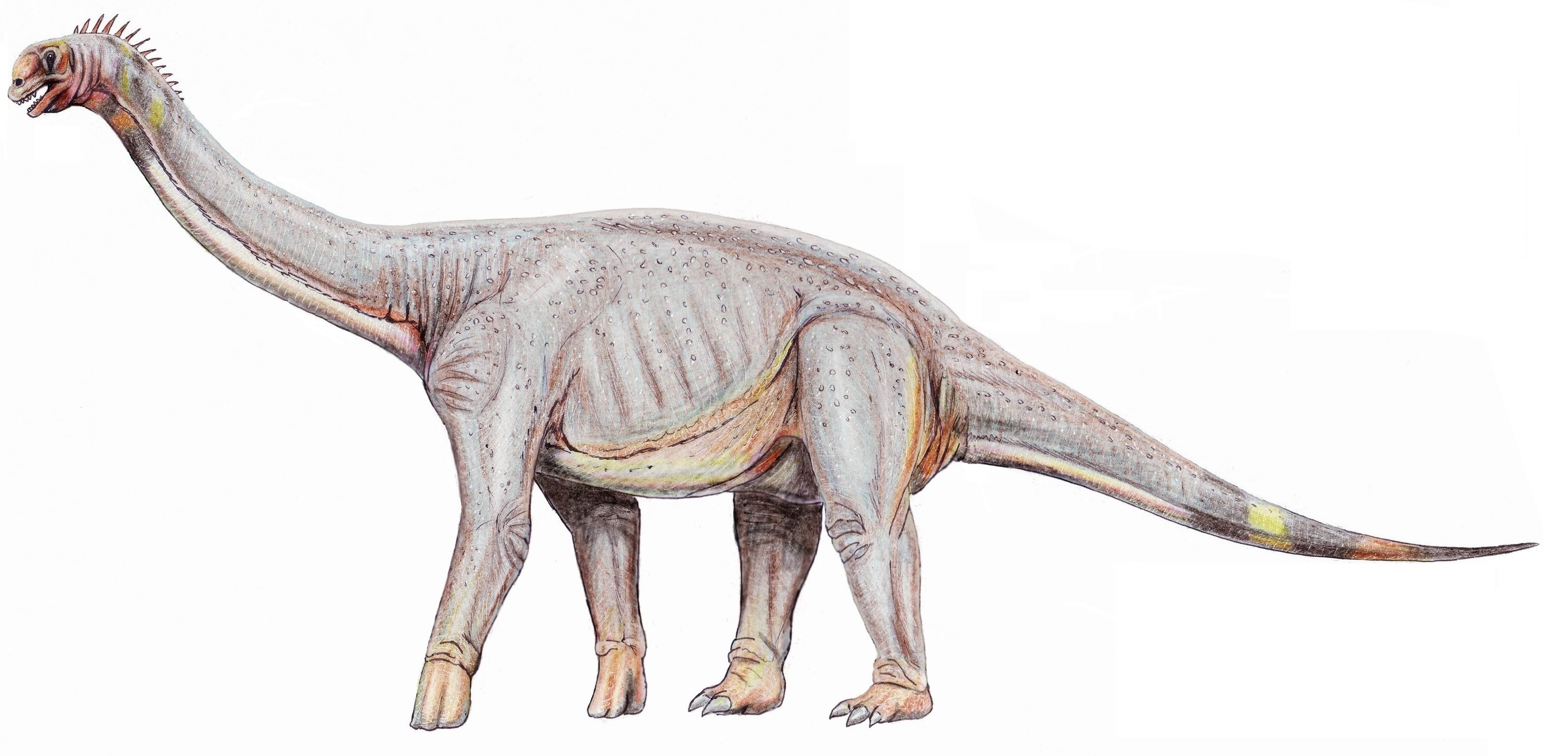
- Life restoration of the Early Cretaceous long-necked dinosaur Astrodon
  †Astrodon
  - †Astrodon johnstoni
- †Astrophocaudia – type locality for genus
  - †Astrophocaudia slaughteri – type locality for species
- †Atreta
  - †Atreta minor
- †Aulastraeopora – type locality for genus
  - †Aulastraeopora harrisi – type locality for species
- †Axonoceras
  - †Axonoceras compressum
  - †Axonoceras multicostatum
  - †Axonoceras multicostatum rotundum
  - †Axonoceras pingue
- †Axosmilia
  - †Axosmilia craginiana – type locality for species
  - †Axosmilia whitneyi – type locality for species

== B ==
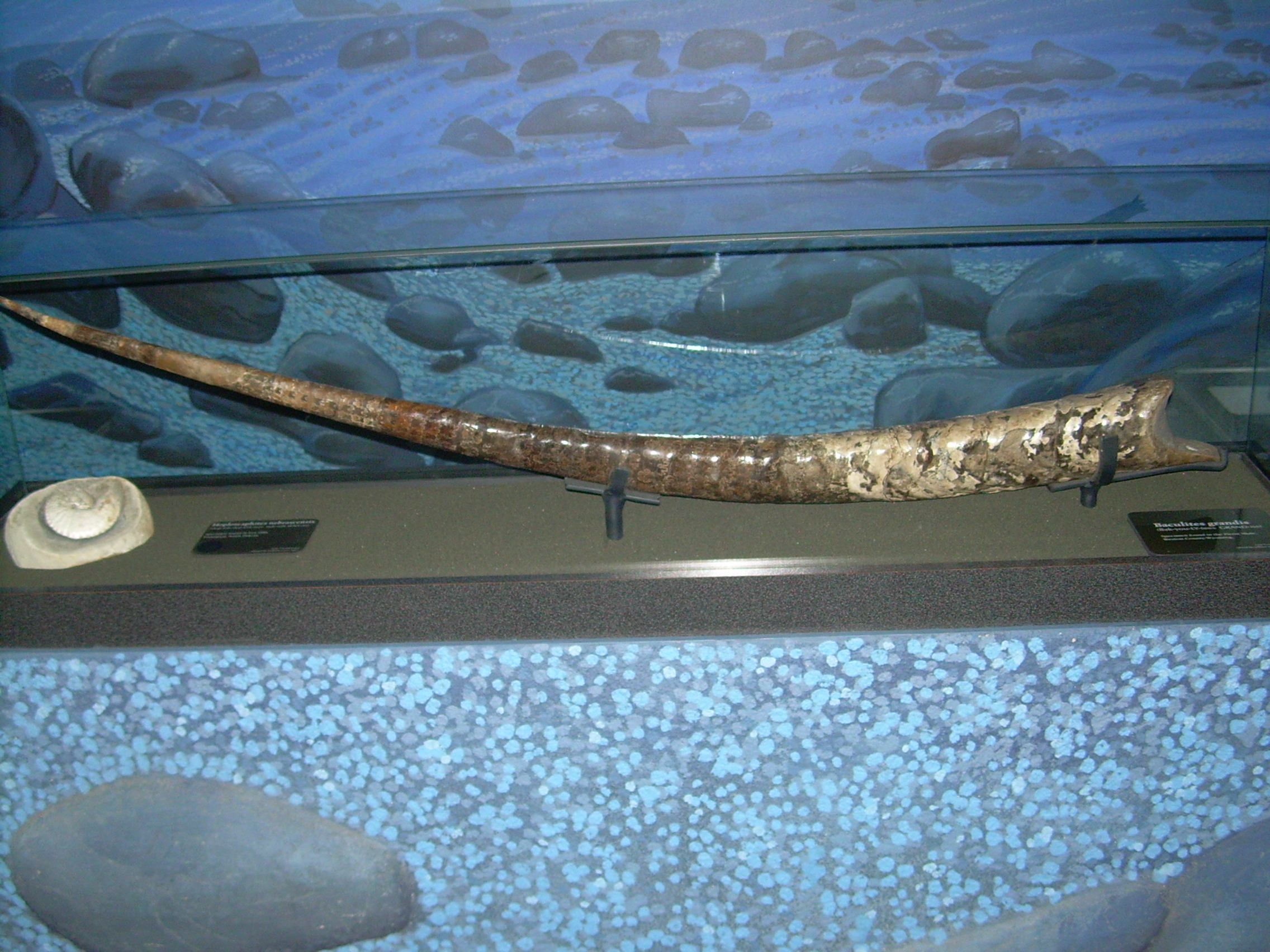
- Fossilized shell of the Late Cretaceous ammonoid cephalopod Baculites
  †Baculites
  - †Baculites aquilaensis - or unidentified loosely related form
  - †Baculites claviformis
  - †Baculites haresi – or unidentified comparable form
  - †Baculites ovatus
  - †Baculites scotti
  - †Baculites taylorensis
  - †Baculites tippahensis
  - †Baculites undatus
- †Baena – report made of unidentified related form or using admittedly obsolete nomenclature
- †Banis
  - †Banis siniformis
- Barbatia – tentative report
  - †Barbatia carolinensis
- †Barroisiceras
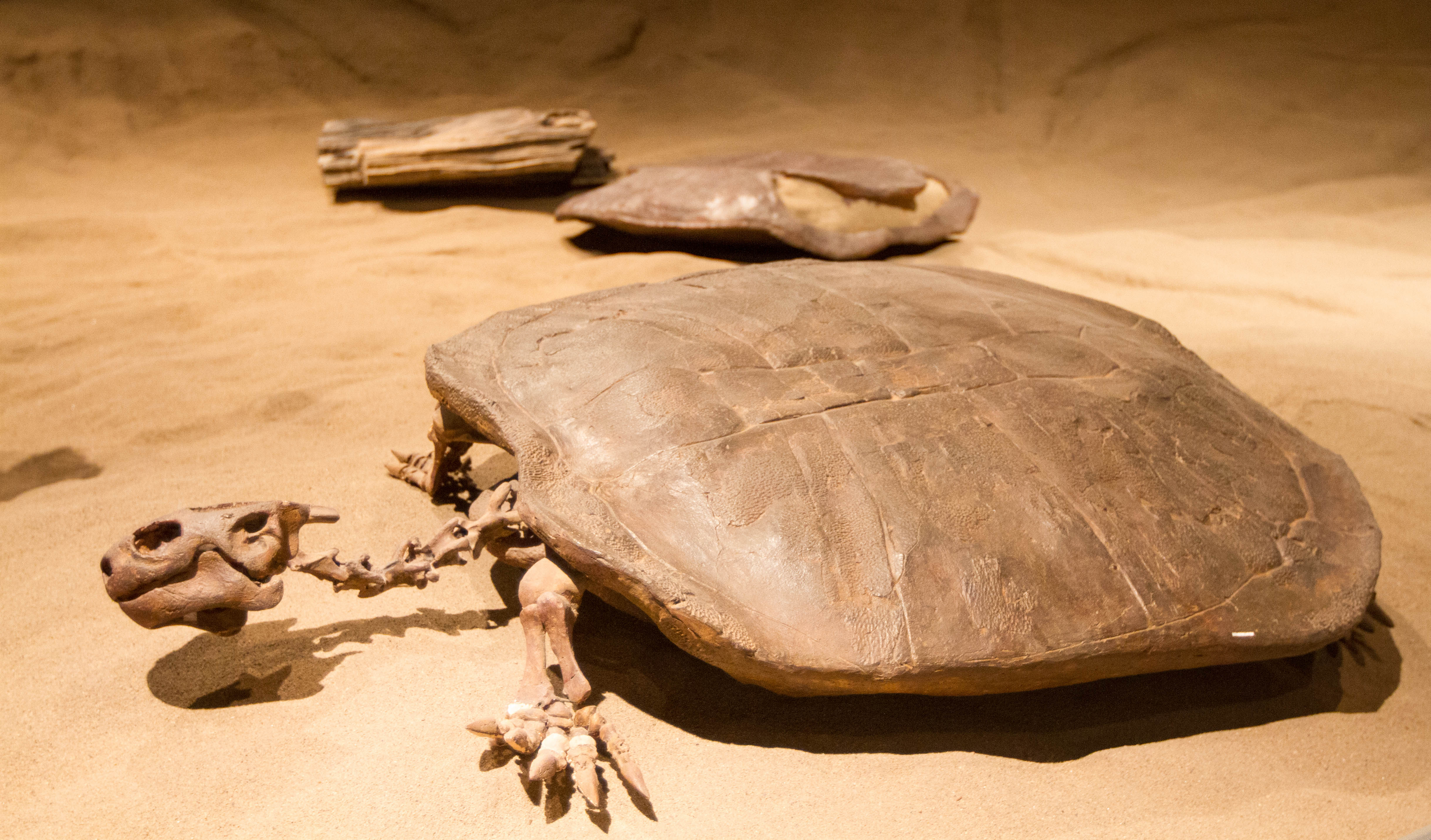
- Mounted fossilized skeleton of the Cretaceous turtle Basilemys
  †Basilemys
- †Bathycyathus – tentative report
  - †Bathycyathus lloydi – type locality for species
- †Bathytormus
  - †Bathytormus pteropsis
- †Belemnitella
  - †Belemnitella americana
- †Bellifusus
  - †Bellifusus angulicostatus – or unidentified related form
  - †Bellifusus buffaloensis
  - †Bellifusus coronatus
  - †Bellifusus crassicostatus
  - †Bellifusus deatsvillensis
  - †Bellifusus multicostatus
  - †Bellifusus robustus
  - †Bellifusus tennistriatus
- †Belliscala
  - †Belliscala crideri
  - †Belliscala forbeyi
  - †Belliscala rockensis
- †Belodon
  - †Belodon superciliosus – type locality for species
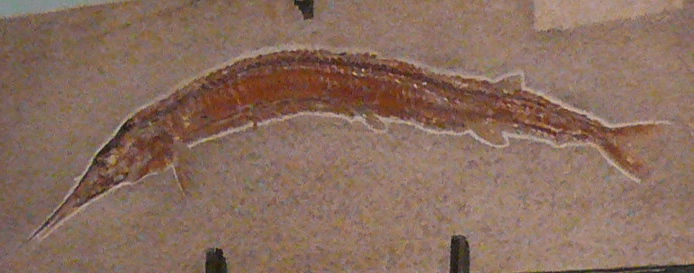
- Fossilized skeleton of the Late Cretaceous bony fish Belonostomus
  †Belonostomus
- †Beretra
  - †Beretra contracta
  - †Beretra elongata
  - †Beretra firma
  - †Beretra ornatula
  - †Beretra ripleyana
  - †Beretra striata
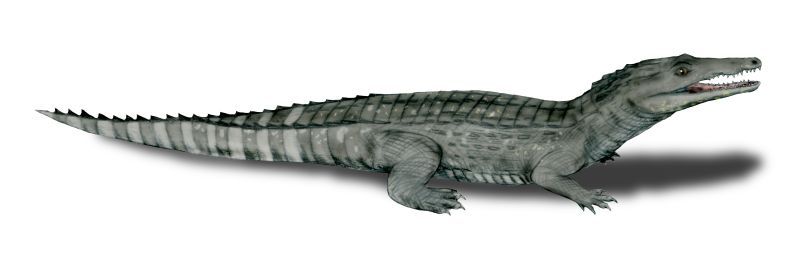
- Life restoration of the Early Cretaceous crocodilian relative Bernissartia
  †Bernissartia – tentative report
- †Betelgeusia – type locality for genus
  - †Betelgeusia reidi – type locality for species
- †Borissiakoceras
  - †Borissiakoceras orbiculatum
- †Bostrychoceras
  - †Bostrychoceras polyplocum
- Botula
  - †Botula carolinensis
  - †Botula conchafodentis
  - †Botula plumosa
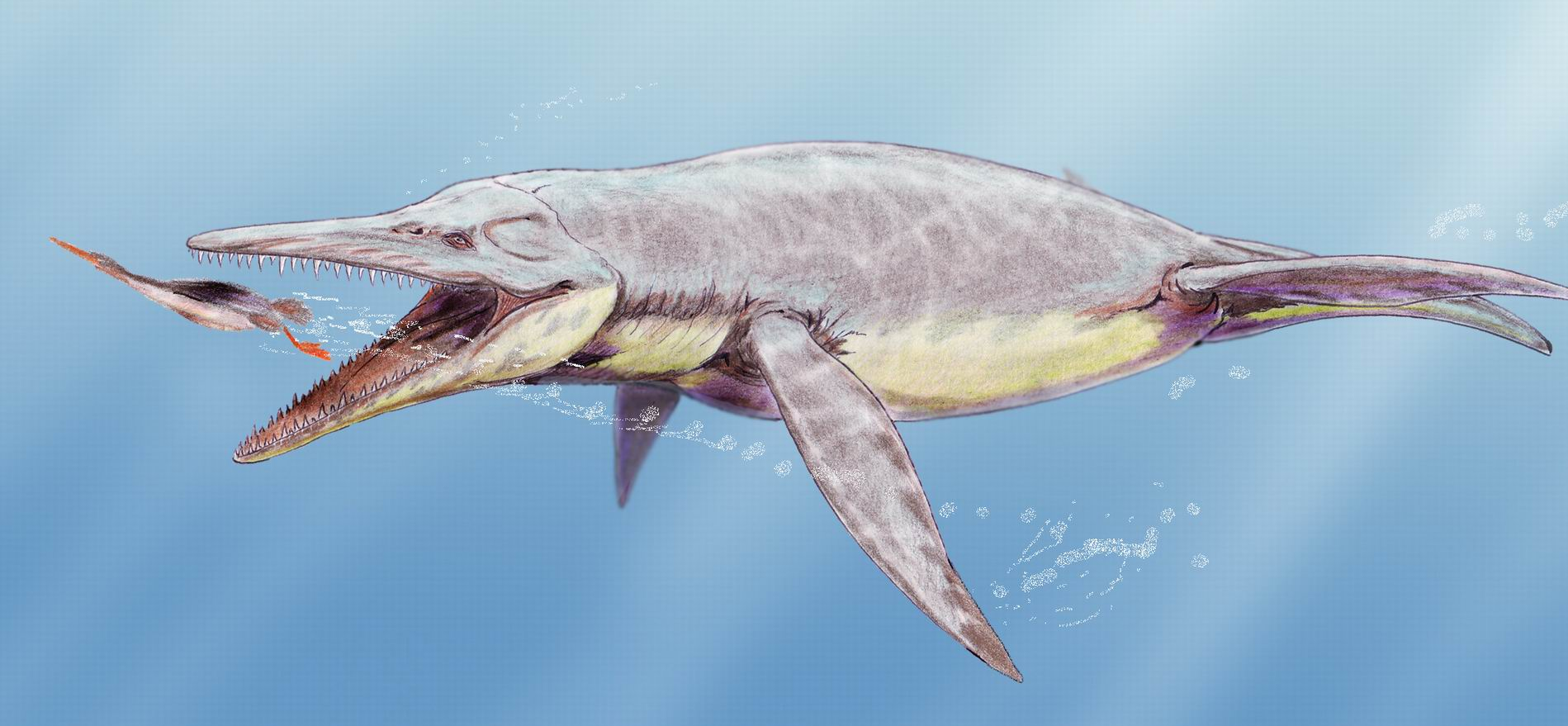
- Life restoration of the Late Cretaceous plesiosaur Brachauchenius hunting a hesperornithiform bird
  †Brachauchenius
  - †Brachauchenius lucasi
- Brachidontes
  - †Brachidontes arlingtonanus
  - †Brachidontes filisculptus
  - †Brachidontes filisculptus microcostae
  - †Brachidontes fulpensis
- Brachiodontes
- †Brachychampsa
- †Brachycythere – tentative report
  - †Brachycythere subconcentrica
- †Brachyrhizodus – type locality for genus
  - †Brachyrhizodus wichitaensis – type locality for species
- †Brachysuchus – type locality for genus
  - †Brachysuchus megalodon – type locality for species
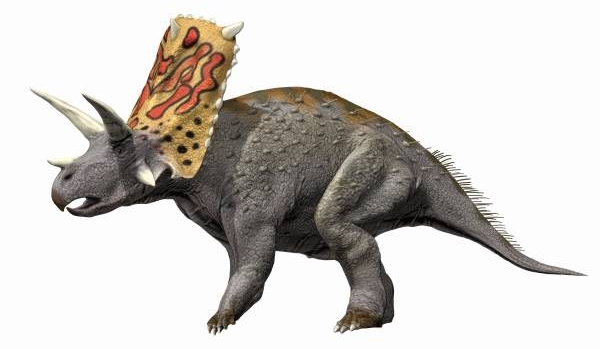
- Life restoration of the Late Cretaceous horned dinosaur Bravoceratops
  †Bravoceratops – type locality for genus
  - †Bravoceratops polyphemus – type locality for species
- †Breviarca
  - †Breviarca grandis
  - †Breviarca habita
  - †Breviarca minor
  - †Breviarca nolani
  - †Breviarca plummeri
- †Brontopodus – type locality for genus
  - †Brontopodus birdi – type locality for species
- †Buccinopsis
  - †Buccinopsis crassa
  - †Buccinopsis crassicostata
  - †Buccinopsis crassus
  - †Buccinopsis globosa
  - †Buccinopsis greenensis
  - †Buccinopsis perryi
  - †Buccinopsis solida
- †Budaia – type locality for genus
  - †Budaia travisensis – type locality for species
- †Budaiceras
  - †Budaiceras alticarinatum
  - †Budaiceras elegantior
  - †Budaiceras hyatti
- †Burckhardtites
  - †Burckhardtites palmensis
- Busycon – tentative report

== C ==
- Cadulus
  - †Cadulus coonensis
  - †Cadulus obnutus
  - †Cadulus praetenuis
- Caestocorbula
  - †Caestocorbula crassaplica
  - †Caestocorbula crassiplica
  - †Caestocorbula suffalciata
  - †Caestocorbula terramaria
  - †Caestocorbula torta
  - †Caestocorbula williardi
- Callianassa
- †Calliomphalus
  - †Calliomphalus americanus
  - †Calliomphalus bellulus
  - †Calliomphalus microcancelli
- Callistina
  - †Callistina alta
  - †Callistina lamarensis
  - †Callistina munda
  - †Callistina taffi
- †Callodus – type locality for genus
  - †Callodus coronatus – type locality for species
- Callucina
  - †Callucina chatfieldana
  - †Callucina oleodorsum
  - †Callucina seminalis
- †Calyptosuchus – type locality for genus
  - †Calyptosuchus wellesi – type locality for species
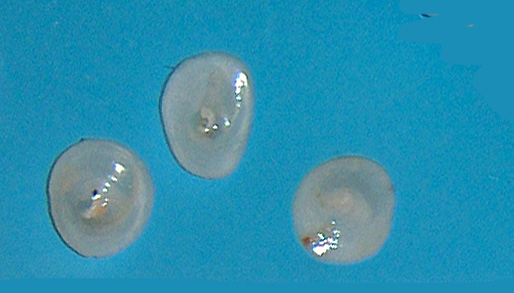
- Three modern shells of Calyptraea, or Chinese hat snails
  Calyptraea
- †Camptonectes
  - †Camptonectes bellisculptus
  - †Camptonectes bubonis
  - †Camptonectes burlingtonensis
  - †Camptonectes cavanus
  - †Camptonectes ellsworthensis
  - †Camptonectes kaufmanensis
  - †Camptonectes martinsensis
- Cancellaria
  - †Cancellaria matroni – tentative report
- †Cantabrigites
  - †Cantabrigites spinosum
  - †Cantabrigites subsimplex – or unidentified related form
- Cantharus – tentative report
- †Cantioscyllium
  - †Cantioscyllium meyeri – type locality for species
- †Capellia – type locality for genus
  - †Capellia mauricei – type locality for species
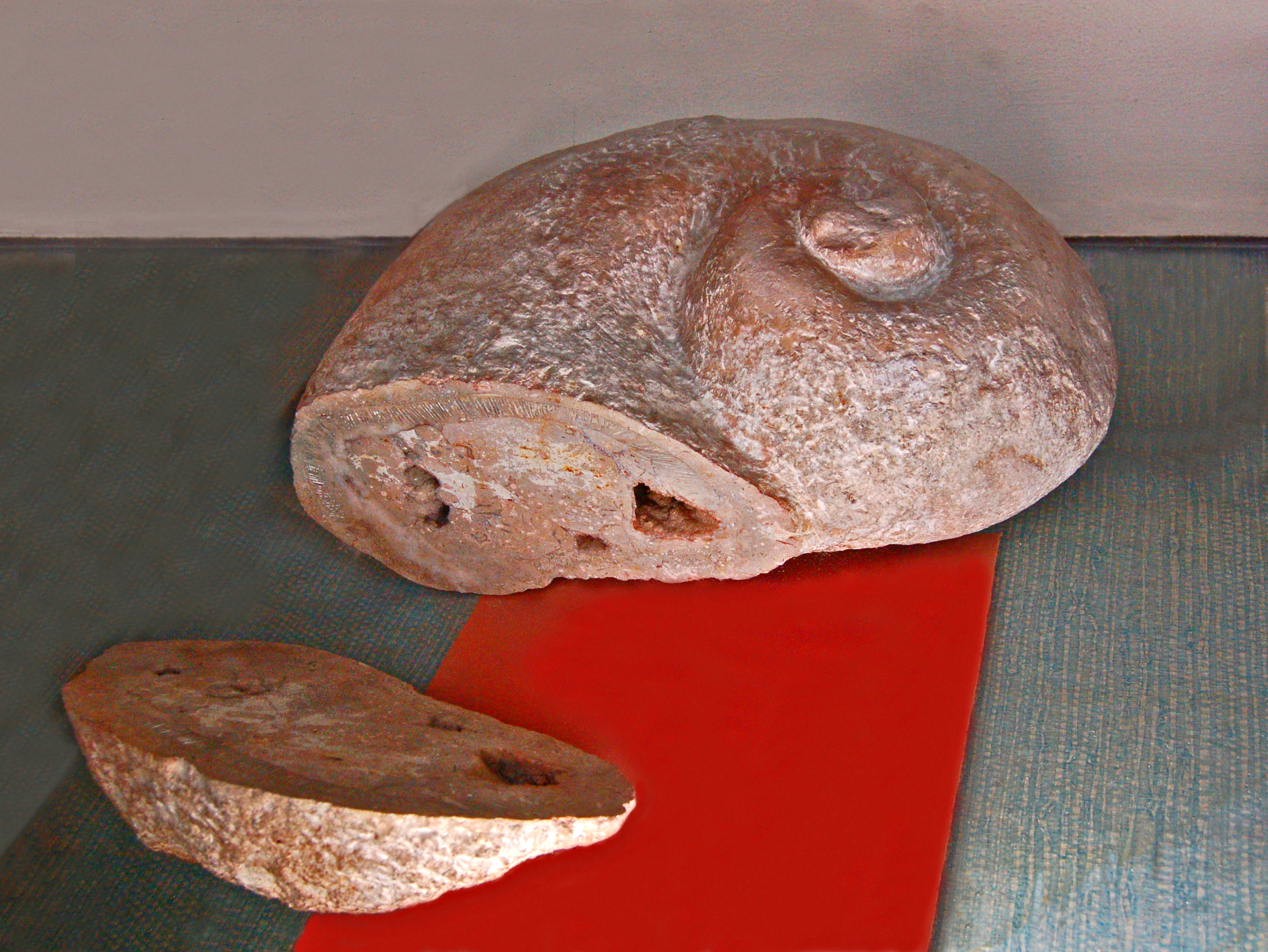
- Fossilized shell of the Cretaceous marine bivalve Caprina
  †Caprina
  - †Caprina coraloidea
  - †Caprina douvillei
- †Caprinuloidea
  - †Caprinuloidea multitubifera
  - †Caprinuloidea perfecta
- Capulus
  - †Capulus cuthandensis
  - †Capulus erectus
  - †Capulus microstriatus – tentative report
  - †Capulus spangleri
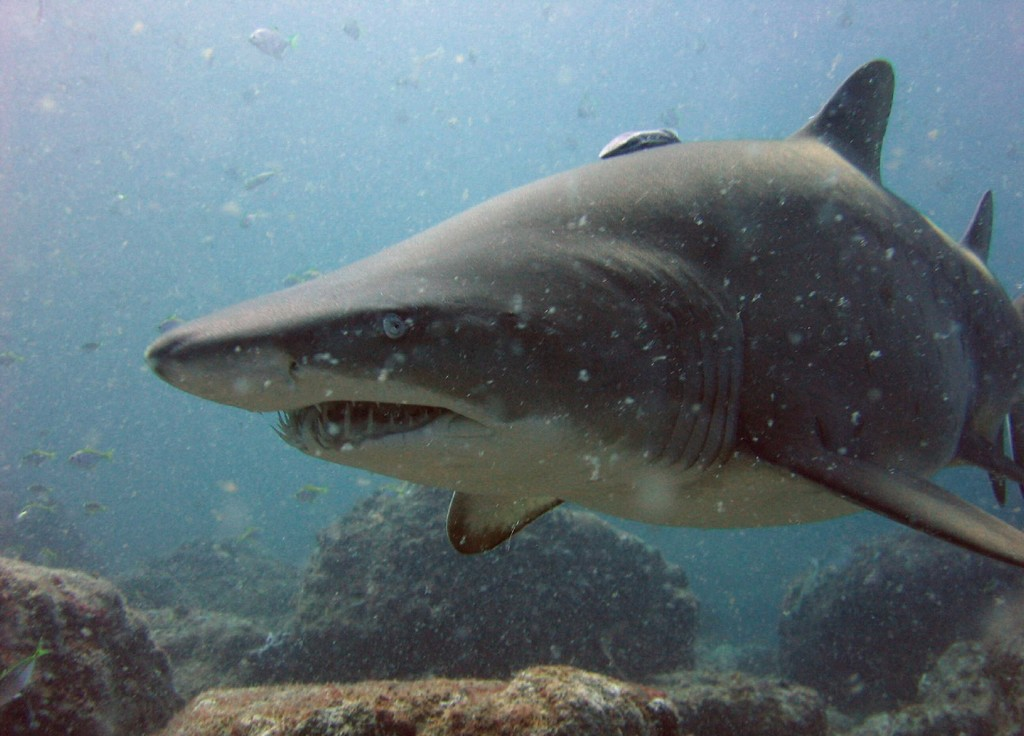
- A living Carcharias sand tiger shark
  Carcharias
  - †Carcharias heathi – type locality for species
  - †Carcharias holmdelensis
  - †Carcharias samhammeri – or unidentified comparable form
- †Cardiaster
  - †Cardiaster leonensis
- Cardium
  - †Cardium wadei
- †Caririchnium
  - †Caririchnium protohadrosaurichnos – type locality for species
- Carota
  - †Carota biplicata
  - †Carota pendula
  - †Carota robusta
- †Carycorbula
  - †Carycorbula martinae
- Caryocorbula
  - †Caryocorbula ovisana
  - †Caryocorbula tradingensis
  - †Caryocorbula varia
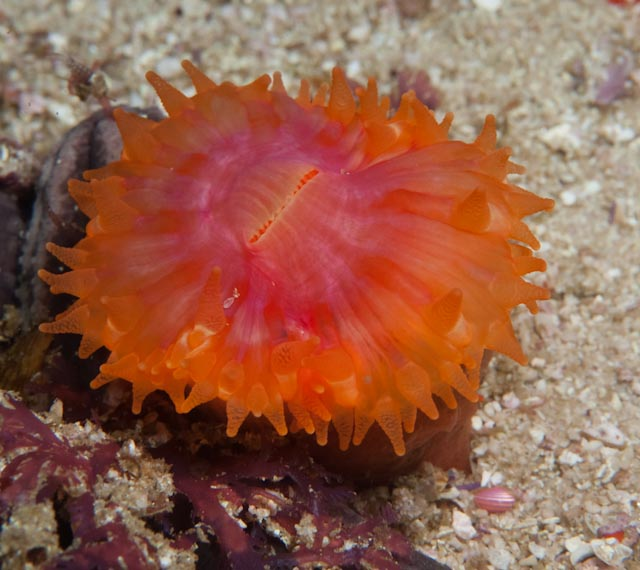
- A living Caryophyllia solitary coral
  Caryophyllia
  - †Caryophyllia comanchei – type locality for species
  - †Caryophyllia dentonensis – type locality for species
  - †Caryophyllia konincki – type locality for species
- †Caseosaurus – type locality for genus
  - †Caseosaurus crosbyensis – type locality for species
- †Casierius
  - †Casierius heckeli
  - †Casierius heckelii
- †Catactegenys – type locality for genus
  - †Catactegenys solaster – type locality for species
- †Catastomocystis
  - †Catastomocystis spinosa
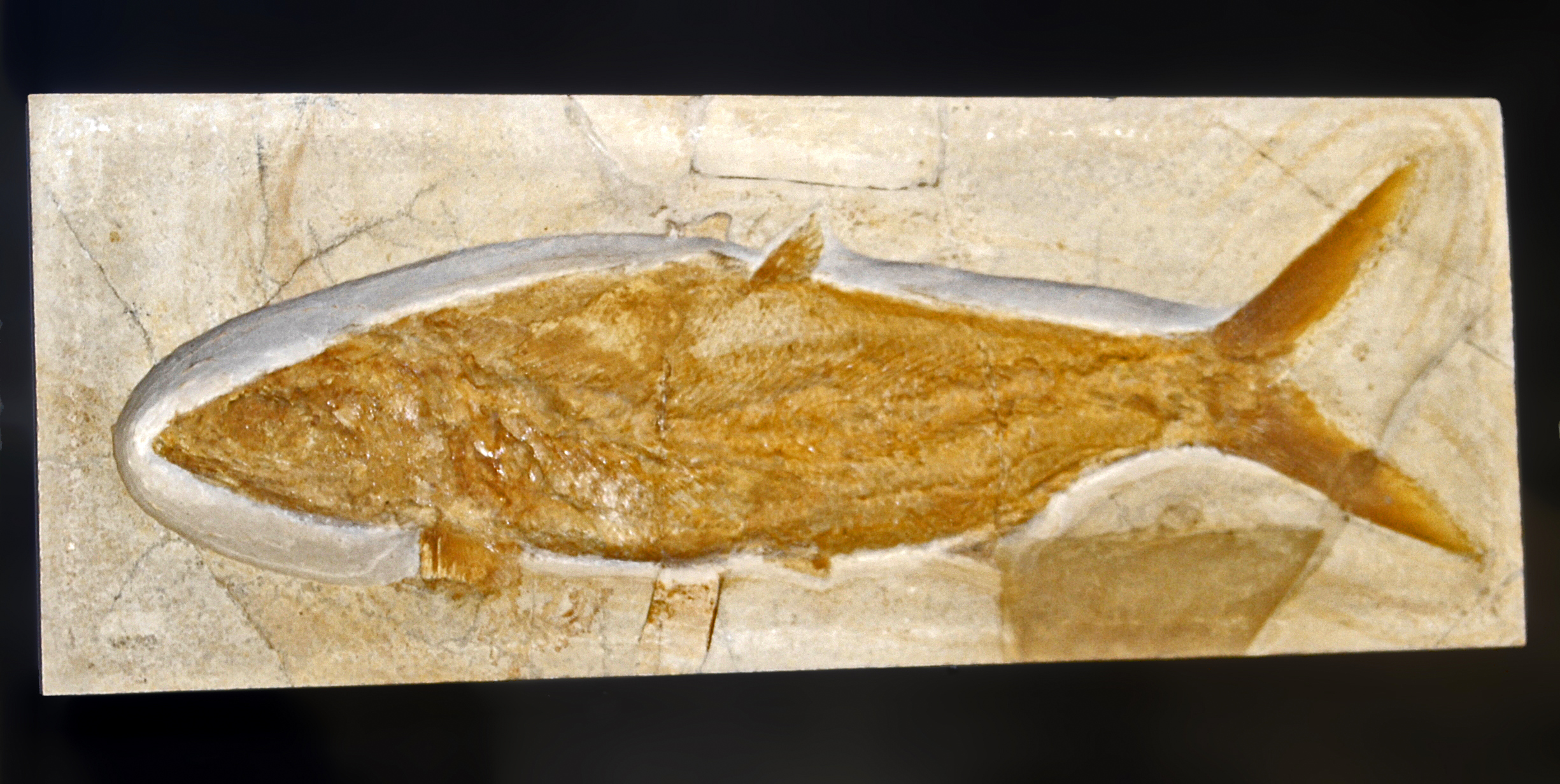
- Fossilized skeleton of the Permian-Early Cretaceous bony fish Caturus
  †Caturus
- †Caveola
  - †Caveola acuta – tentative report
  - †Caveola bellsana
  - †Caveola producta
- †Cedarosaurus
  - †Cedarosaurus weiskopfae
- †Cenomanocarcinus
  - †Cenomanocarcinus refroae
  - †Cenomanocarcinus renfroae
  - †Cenomanocarcinus vanstraeleni
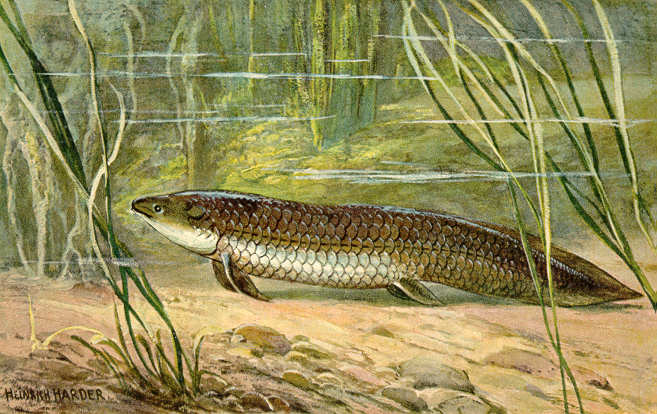
- Life restoration of the Late Triassic-Eocene lungfish Ceratodus
  †Ceratodus
  - †Ceratodus americanus – or unidentified comparable form
- Ceratotrochus – tentative report
- †Ceriopora
- Cerithiella
  - †Cerithiella nodoliratum – or unidentified related form
  - †Cerithiella semirugatum
- Cerithium
  - †Cerithium simpsonensis
- †Chamops
- †Champsosaurus
- †Chartecytis
- †Cheloniceras
  - †Cheloniceras adkinsi
  - †Cheloniceras cornuelianum
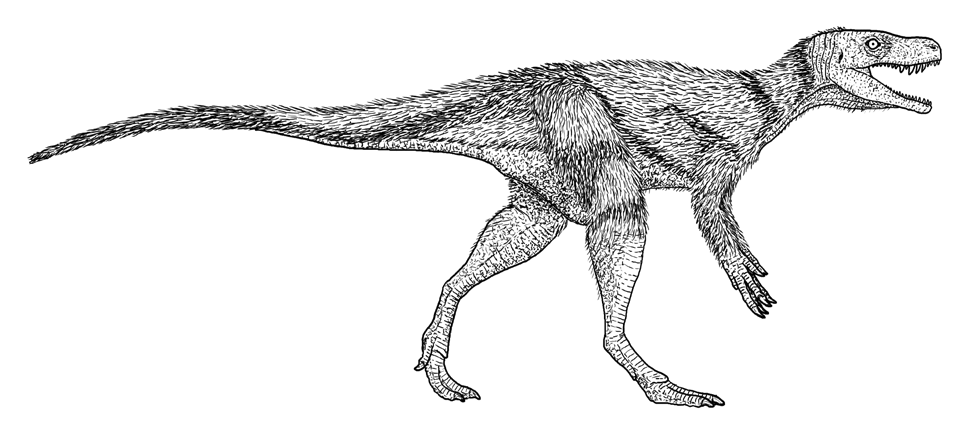
- Restoration of the Late Triassic theropod dinosaur Chindesaurus
  †Chindesaurus
  - †Chindesaurus bryansmalli
- †Chinlea
  - †Chinlea sorenseni
- †Chirostenotes
- †Chondrodonta
  - †Chondrodonta glabra
  - †Chondrodonta munsoni
  - †Chondrodonta youngi – type locality for species
- †Chupacabrachelys – type locality for genus
  - †Chupacabrachelys complexus – type locality for species
- Cidaris
  - †Cidaris hemigranosus
  - †Cidaris texanus
- †Cimexomys
- †Cimoliasaurus
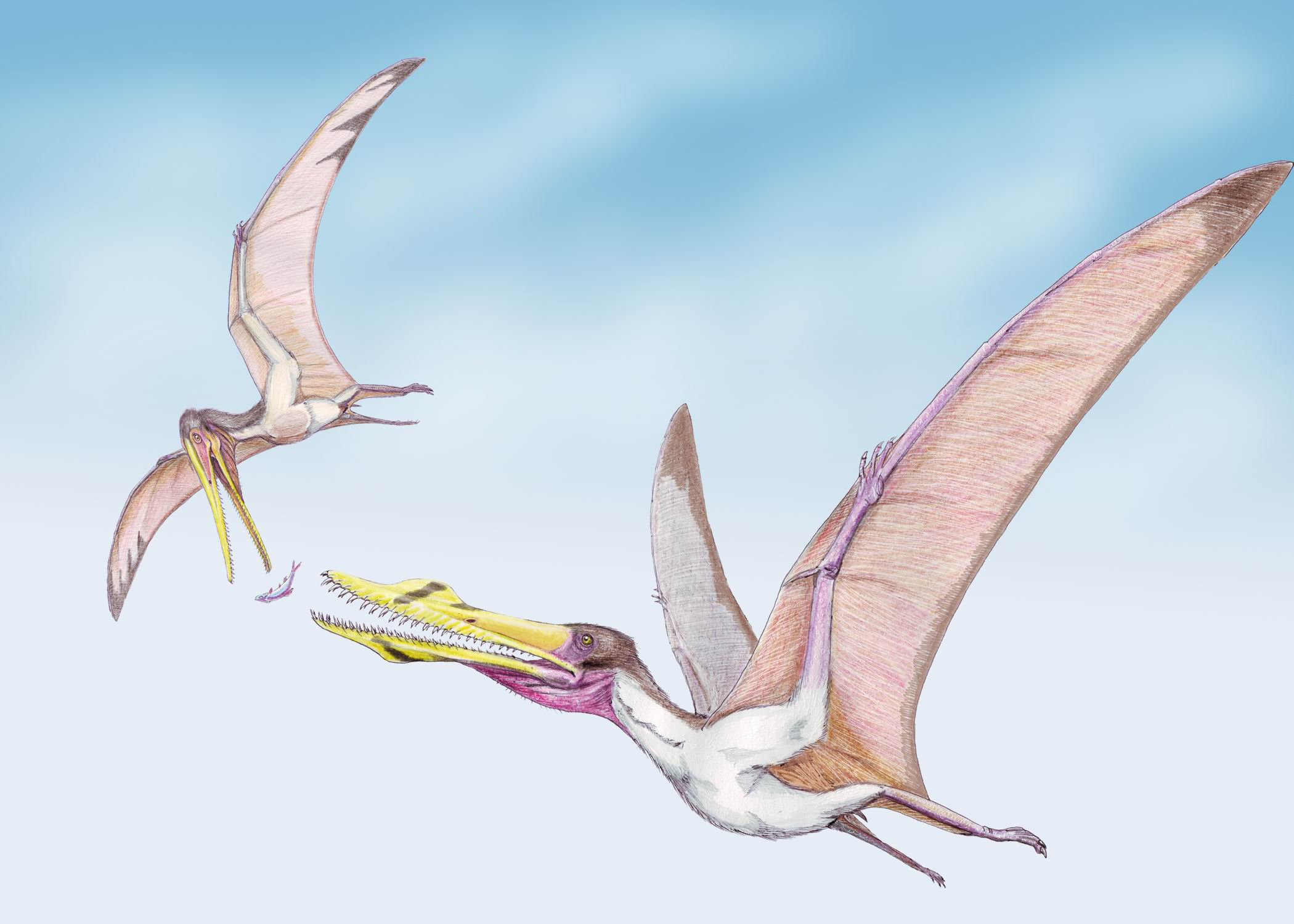
- Life restoration of the Late Cretaceous pterosaur Cimoliopterus (left) stealing fish from another pterosaur
  †Cimoliopterus
  - †Cimoliopterus dunni – type locality for species
- †Cimolodon
  - †Cimolodon electus – or unidentified comparable form
- †Cimolomys
  - †Cimolomys clarki
- †Cinulia
  - †Cinulia tarrantensis – or unidentified related form
- †Cionichthys
  - †Cionichthys greeni – type locality for species
- †Citharina
  - †Citharina kochii
- †Cladoceramus
  - †Cladoceramus undulatoplicatus
- †Cladophyllia
  - †Cladophyllia furcifera
- †Clavipholas
  - †Clavipholas pectorosa
  - †Clavipholas whitfieldi
- †Clevosaurus – or unidentified comparable form
  - †Clevosaurus latidens
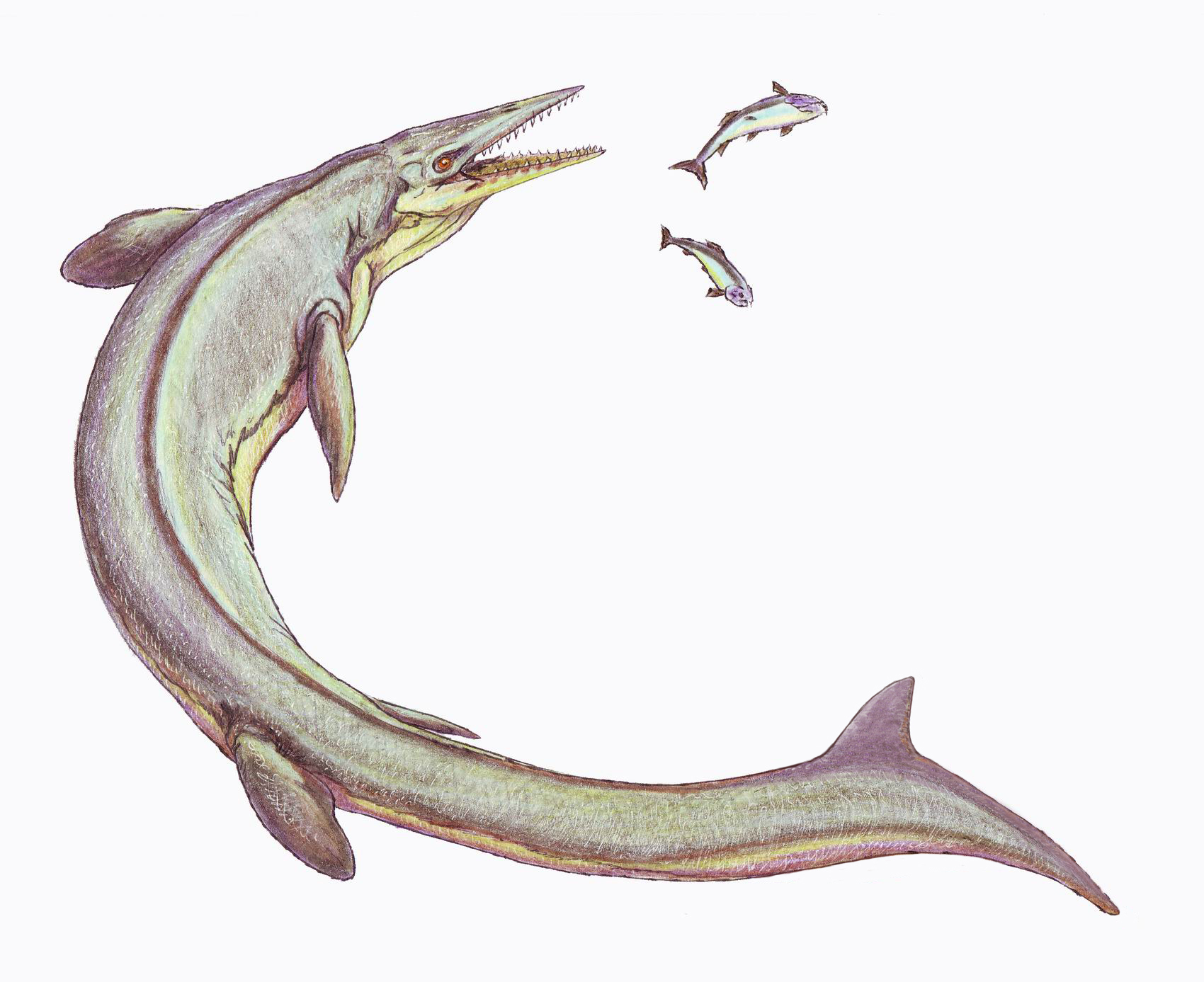
- Life restoration of the Late Cretaceous mosasaurid Clidastes
  †Clidastes
  - †Clidastes liodontus
- Cliona
  - †Cliona microtuberum
  - †Cliona retiformis
- †Clisocolus
  - †Clisocolus concentricum
- †Coahomasuchus – type locality for genus
  - †Coahomasuchus kahleorum – type locality for species
- †Coahuilites – tentative report
- †Coalcomana
  - †Coalcomana ramosa
- †Codiopsis
  - †Codiopsis stephensoni – type locality for species
- †Coelodus
  - †Coelodus decaturensis – type locality for species
  - †Coelodus fabadens – type locality for species
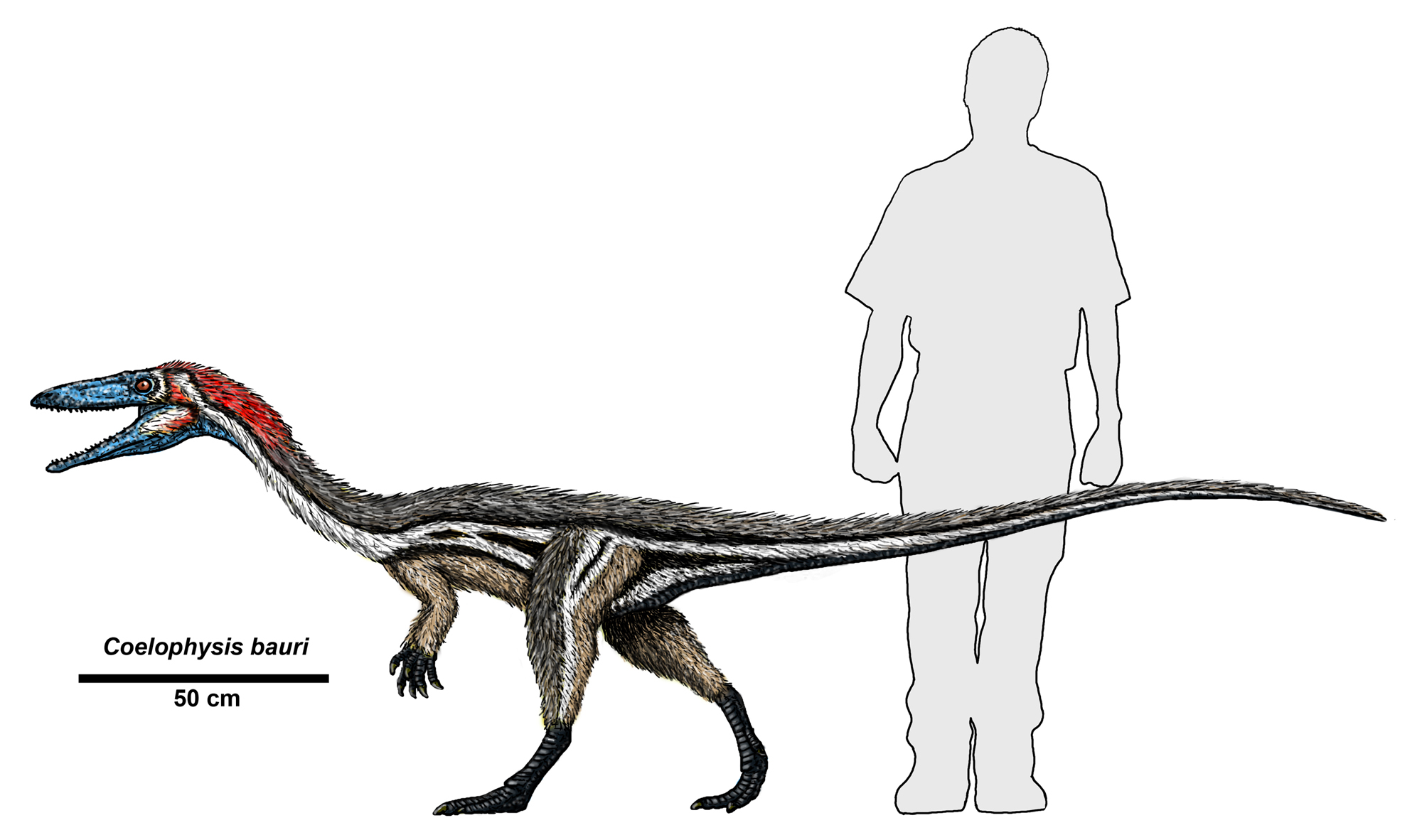
- Life restoration of the Late Triassic-Early Jurassic theropod dinosaur Coelophysis with an anachronistic human to scale
  †Coelophysis
- †Coelosmilia
  - †Coelosmilia americana
  - †Coelosmilia texana
- †Coilopoceras
  - †Coilopoceras springeri
- †Collignoniceras
  - †Collignoniceras woollgari
- †Colognathus – type locality for genus
  - †Colognathus obscurus – type locality for species
- †Colombiceras
  - †Colombiceras robustum
- †Columbiceras
  - †Columbiceras robustus
- †Comptoniaster
  - †Comptoniaster adamsi
- †Confusiscala – tentative report
- †Coniasaurus
  - †Coniasaurus crassidens
- †Connectastrea – tentative report
  - †Connectastrea infundibuliformis – type locality for species
- Conopeum
- †Continuoolithus
- †Conulus
  - †Conulus stephensoni – type locality for species
- †Convolosaurus – type locality for genus
  - †Convolosaurus marri – type locality for species
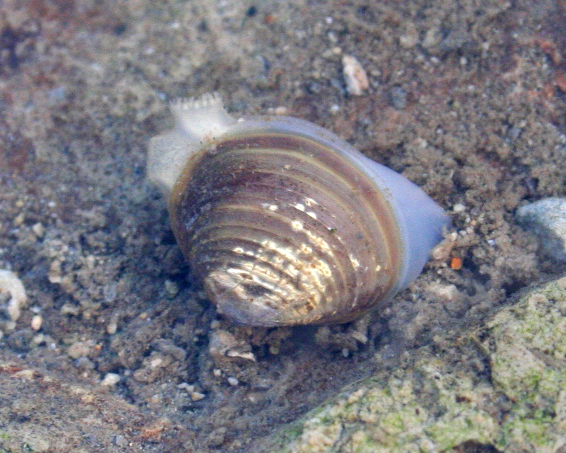
- A living Corbicula basket clam
  Corbicula
- Corbula
  - †Corbula amniculana
  - †Corbula dentonensis
  - †Corbula inflata
  - †Corbula linteroidea
  - †Corbula ponsana
  - †Corbula pulvinata
  - †Corbula rockensis
  - †Corbula senecta
  - †Corbula starana
  - †Corbula subradiata
  - †Corbula subradiata texana
  - †Corbula torta – or unidentified related form
  - †Corbula williardi – tentative report
  - †Corbula woodi
- †Coskinolinoides
  - †Coskinolinoides texanus
- †Costellacesta
  - †Costellacesta sayrei
- †Coupatezia
  - †Coupatezia turneri – type locality for species
- †Craginia
  - †Craginia turriformis
- Crassatella
  - †Crassatella hodgei
  - †Crassatella quinlanensis
  - †Crassatella vadosa
  - †Crassatella vadosa bexarensis
  - †Crassatella vadosa cedarensis
  - †Crassatella vadosa chatfieldensis
  - †Crassatella vadosa manorensis
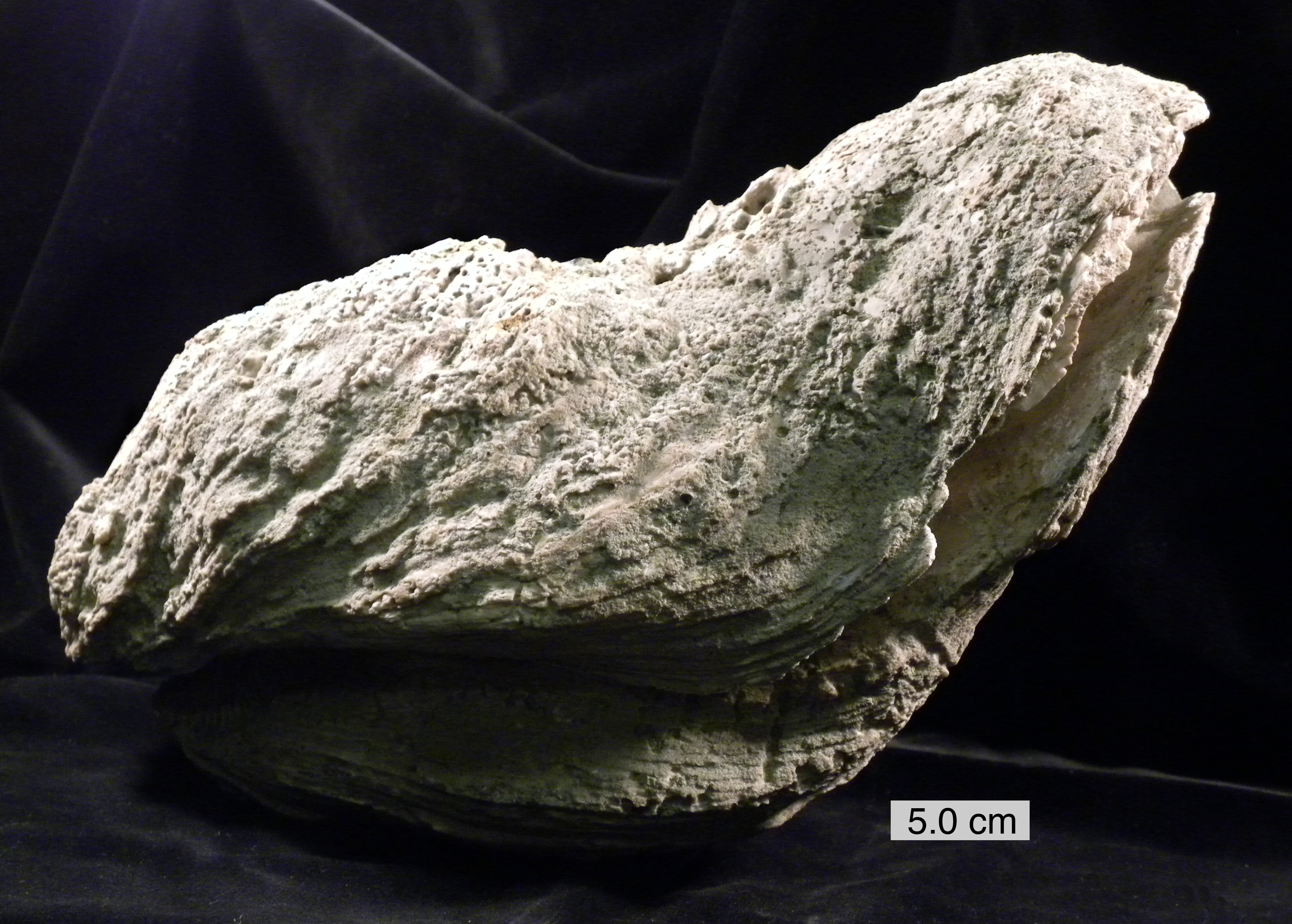
- Fossilized shell of the Cretaceous-modern oyster Crassostrea
  Crassostrea
  - †Crassostrea cortex
  - †Crassostrea cusseta
  - †Crassostrea trigonalis
- †Crateraster
  - †Crateraster quinqueloba
  - †Crateraster texensis
- †Crenella
  - †Crenella elegantula
  - †Crenella serica
  - †Crenella subcircularis
- †Creonella
  - †Creonella deusseni
  - †Creonella triplicata
  - †Creonella whitei
- †Cretacoranina
  - †Cretacoranina dichrous
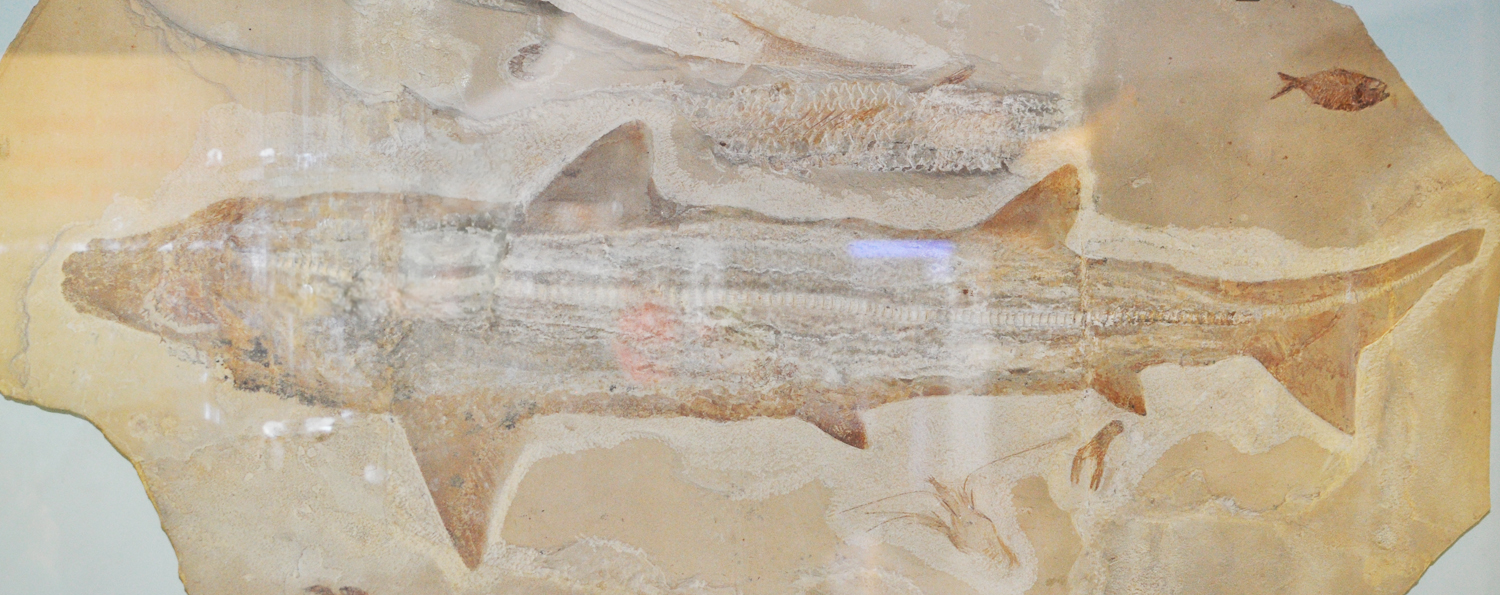
- Fossil of the Early Cretaceous-Eocene shark Cretolamna
  †Cretolamna
  - †Cretolamna appendiculata
  - †Cretolamna maroccana
- †Cretorectolobus
  - †Cretorectolobus olsoni – or unidentified comparable form
- †Crosbysaurus – type locality for genus
  - †Crosbysaurus harrisae – type locality for species
- Ctena
  - †Ctena parvilineata
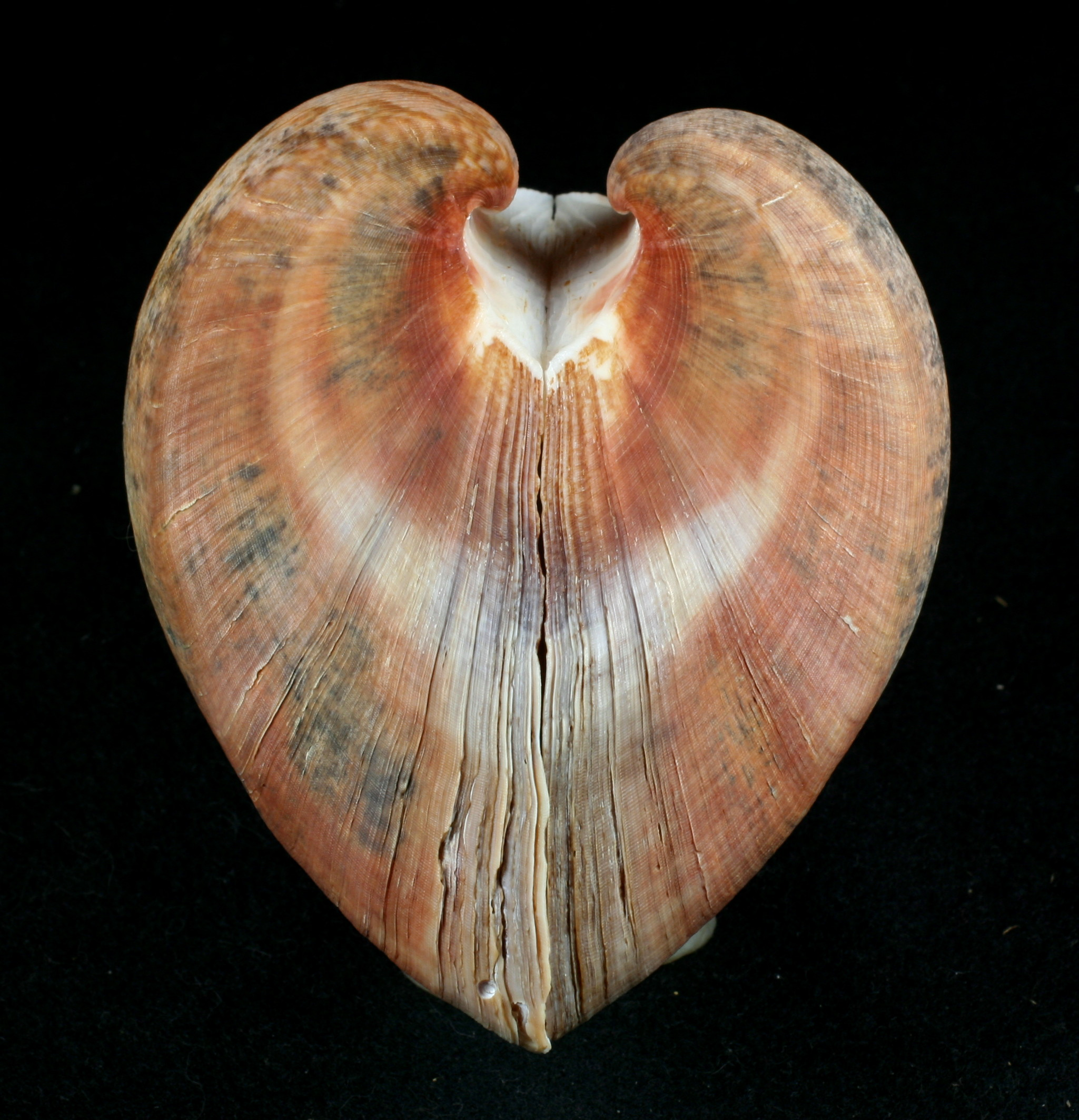
- Shell of a Cucullaea, or false ark shell
  Cucullaea
  - †Cucullaea blanpiedi
  - †Cucullaea capax
  - †Cucullaea deatvillensis
  - †Cucullaea kingsensis
  - †Cucullaea murrayi
  - †Cucullaea powersi
- †Cuna
  - †Cuna texana
- †Curtocaprina – type locality for genus
  - †Curtocaprina clabaughikinsorum – type locality for species
- Cuspidaria
  - †Cuspidaria alaeformis
  - †Cuspidaria ampulla
  - †Cuspidaria grandis
  - †Cuspidaria grovensis
- †Cyathomorpha – tentative report
  - †Cyathomorpha damoni – type locality for species
- †Cyathophora
  - †Cyathophora haysensis – type locality for species
  - †Cyathophora olssoni – type locality for species
- †Cyclorisma
  - †Cyclorisma orbiculata
  - †Cyclorisma parva
  - †Cyclorisma pumila
- †Cyclothyris
  - †Cyclothyris americana
- Cylichna
  - †Cylichna incisa
  - †Cylichna secalina
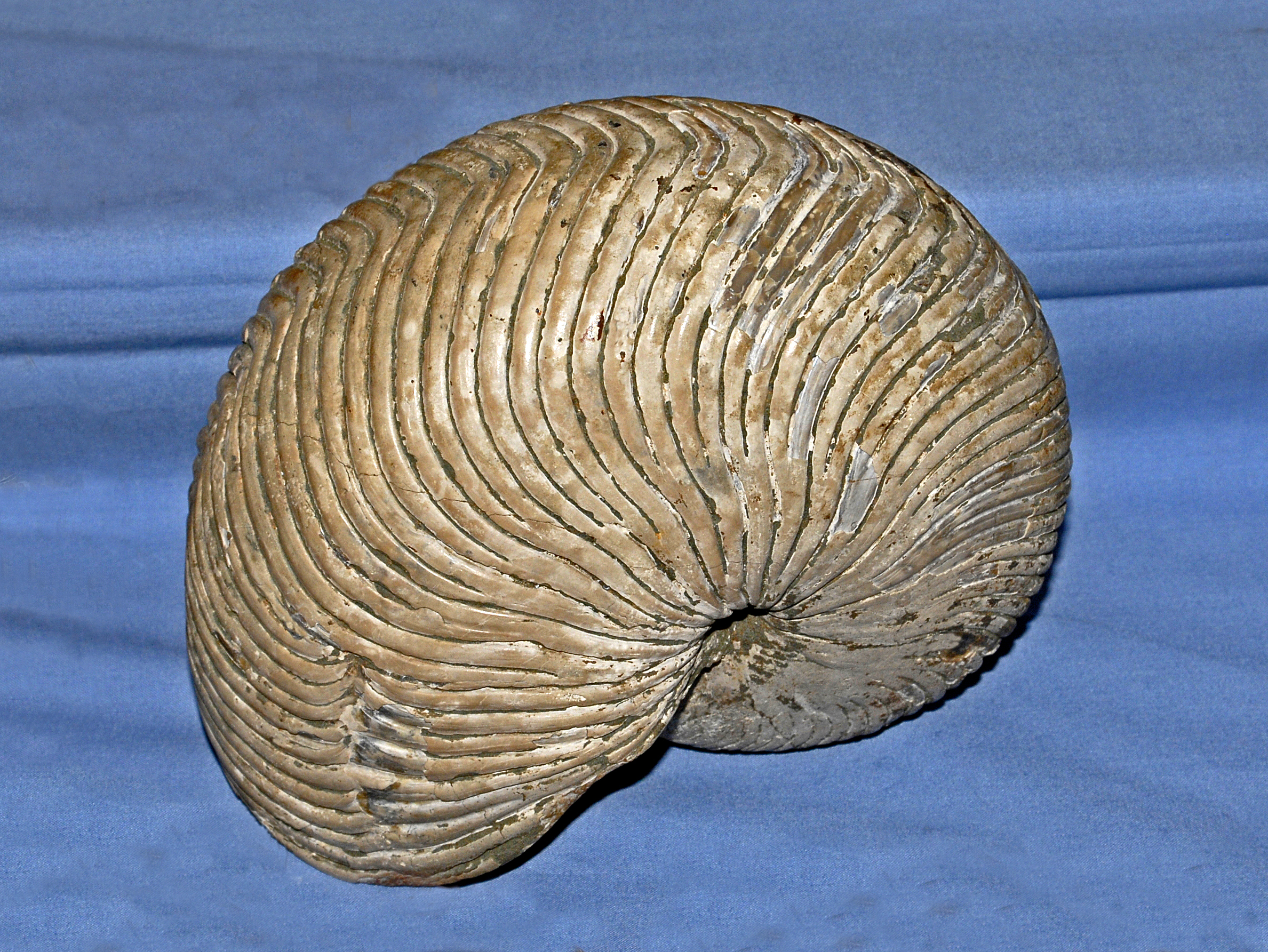
- Fossilized shell of the Late Jurassic-Oligocene nautiloid cephalopod Cymatoceras
  †Cymatoceras
  - †Cymatoceras hilli – or unidentified comparable form
  - †Cymatoceras texanum
- †Cymbophora
  - †Cymbophora appressa
  - †Cymbophora berryi
  - †Cymbophora cancellosa
  - †Cymbophora inflata
  - †Cymbophora puteana
  - †Cymbophora saccellana
  - †Cymbophora scabellum
  - †Cymbophora schucherti
  - †Cymbophora securis
  - †Cymbophora simpsonensis
  - †Cymbophora spooneri
  - †Cymbophora subtilis
  - †Cymbophora wordeni
- †Cymella
  - †Cymella bella
  - †Cymella bella texana
  - †Cymella ironensis
- †Cypridae
  - †Cypridae wyomingensis – or unidentified related form
- †Cyprimeria
  - †Cyprimeria alta
  - †Cyprimeria coonensis
  - †Cyprimeria depressa
  - †Cyprimeria patella
- Cythere
  - †Cythere concentrica
- †Cythereis
  - †Cythereis dentonensis
  - †Cythereis hawleyi
  - †Cythereis nuda
  - †Cythereis ornatissima
  - †Cythereis paupera
  - †Cythereis pustulosissima
  - †Cythereis worthensis
- Cytherella
  - †Cytherella comanchensis
- Cytherelloidea
  - †Cytherelloidea reticulata
  - †Cytherelloidea williamsoniana
- Cytheropteron
  - †Cytheropteron rugosalatum
- Cyzicus – tentative report
  - †Cyzicus shupei

== D ==
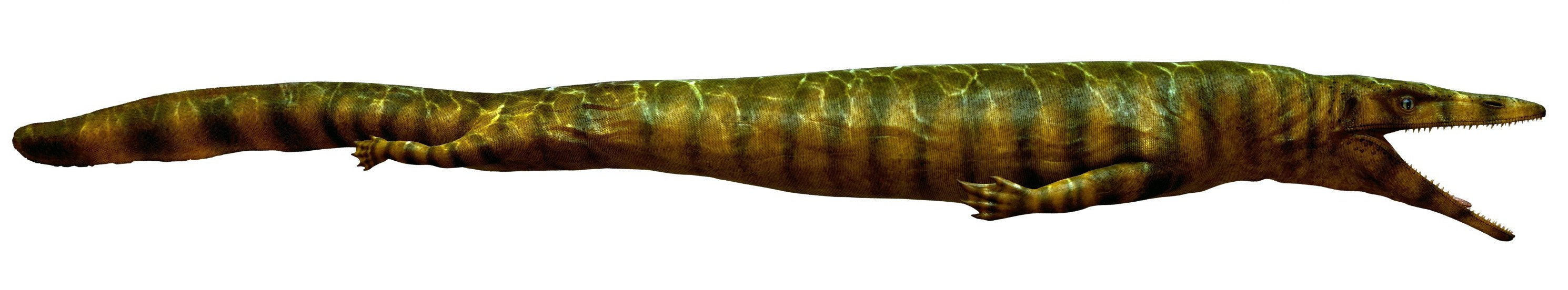
- Life restoration of the Late Cretaceous primitive mosasaur Dallasaurus
  †Dallasaurus – type locality for genus
  - †Dallasaurus turneri – type locality for species
- †Darwinula
- Dasmosmilia
  - †Dasmosmilia kochii – type locality for species
- Dasyatis
  - †Dasyatis commercensis – type locality for species
- †Dathmila
  - †Dathmila lineola
- †Dawsonius
  - †Dawsonius tigris
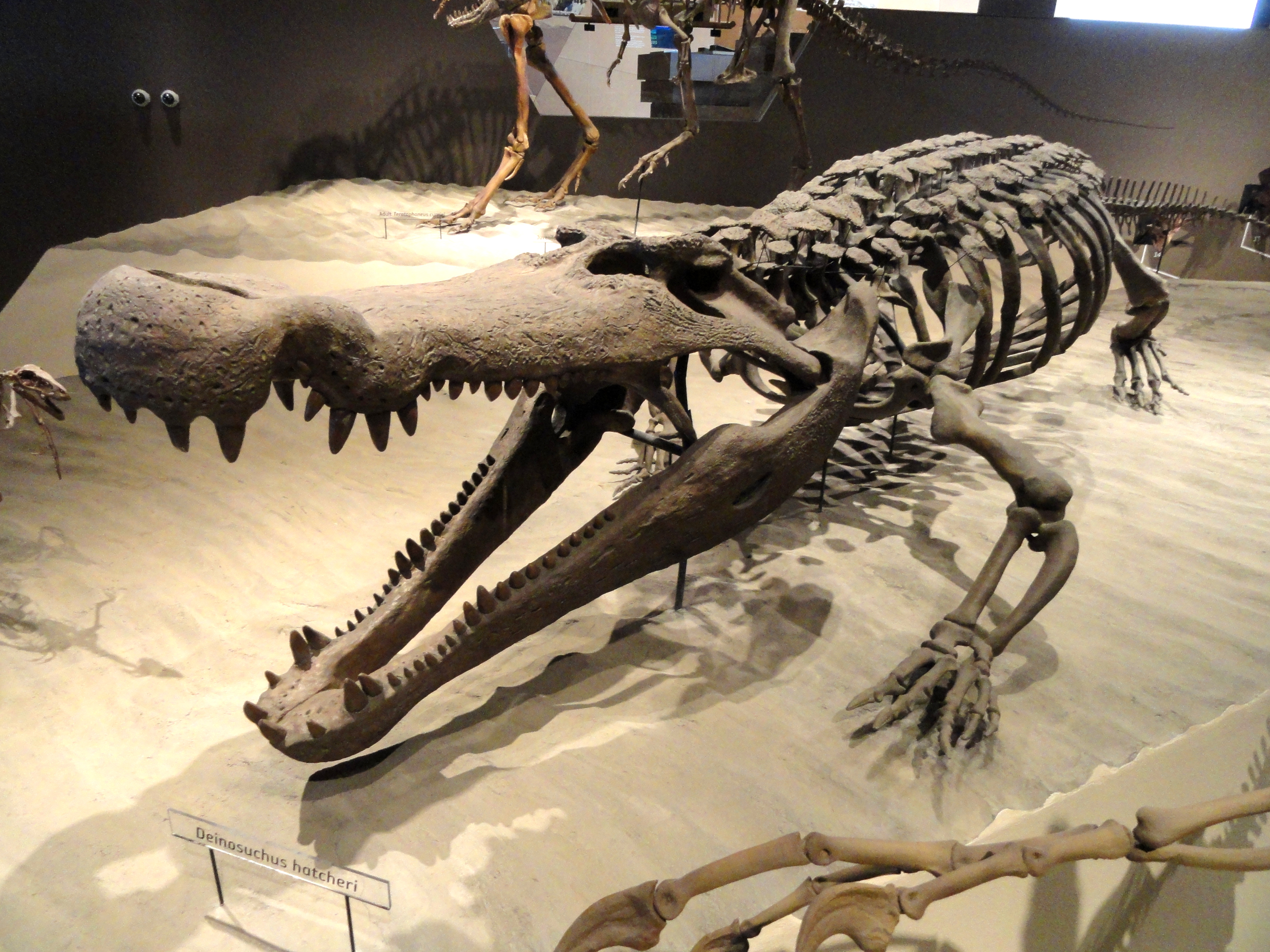
- Mounted fossilized skeleton of the Late Cretaceous Alligator relative Deinosuchus
  †Deinosuchus
  - †Deinosuchus riograndensis
  - †Deinosuchus rugosus – type locality for species
- †Deltaichthys
  - †Deltaichthys albuloides
- †Dendrosmilia – tentative report
  - †Dendrosmilia texana
- †Denebia – type locality for genus
  - †Denebia americana
- Dentalina
  - †Dentalina communis
- Dentalium
  - †Dentalium inornatum
  - †Dentalium leve
  - †Dentalium minor
  - †Dentalium navarroi
  - †Dentalium pauperculum
  - †Dentalium sublineatum
  - †Dentalium vaughani
- †Dentonia
  - †Dentonia leveretti
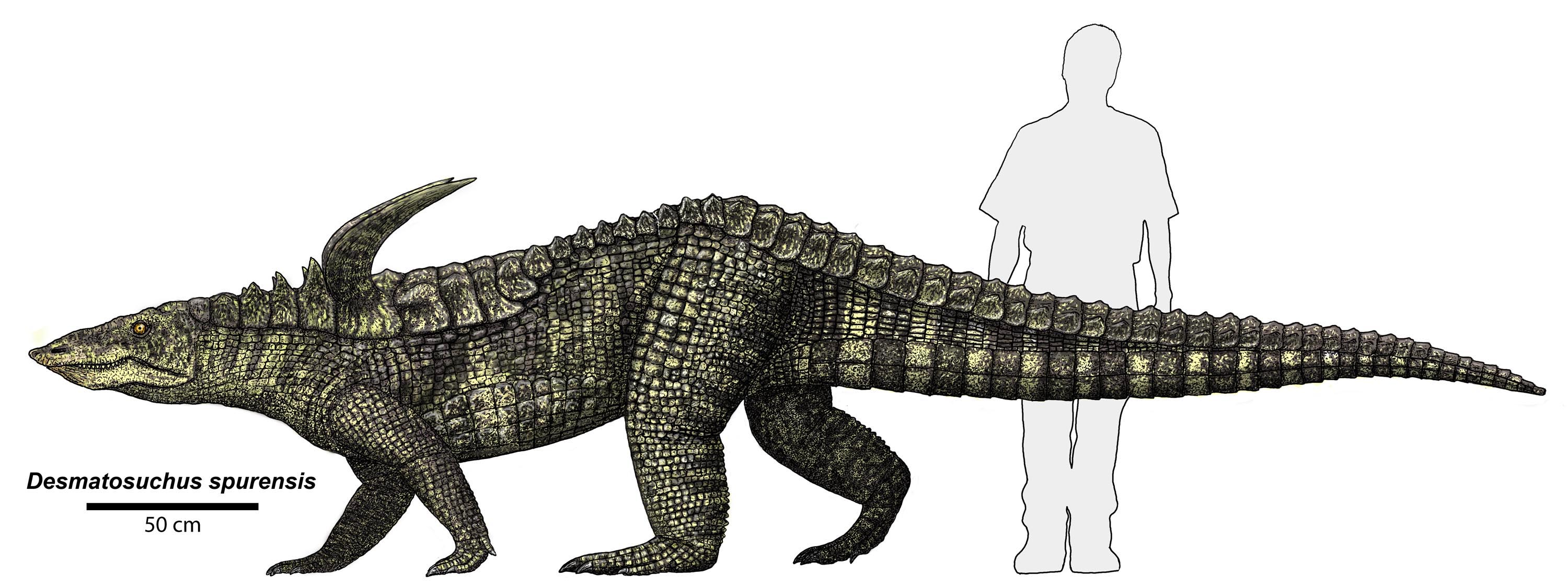
- Restoration of the Late Triassic aetosaur Desmatosuchus with an anachronistic human to scale
  †Desmatosuchus
  - †Desmatosuchus haplocerus
  - †Desmatosuchus smalli – type locality for species
  - †Desmatosuchus spurensis – type locality for species
- †Desmoceras
- †Deussenia
  - †Deussenia bellalirata
  - †Deussenia ciboloensis
  - †Deussenia corbis
  - †Deussenia multilirae
  - †Deussenia travisana
- †Dhondtichlamys
  - †Dhondtichlamys venustus
- †Dichastopollenites
- †Dictyoconus
  - †Dictyoconus walnutensis
- †Dimorpharaea
  - †Dimorpharaea manchacaensis – type locality for species
- †Dimorphastrea
  - †Dimorphastrea stantoni – type locality for species
- †Dinogymnium
  - †Dinogymnium acuminatum
  - †Dinogymnium euclaense
- Diodora – tentative report
  - †Diodora bartonvillensis
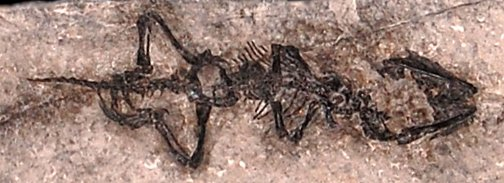
- Fossilized skeleton of the Late Triassic tuatara relative Diphydontosaurus
  †Diphydontosaurus – or unidentified related form
- †Diploastrea
  - †Diploastrea harrisi – type locality for species
  - †Diploastrea hilli – type locality for species
  - †Diploastrea vaughani – type locality for species
- †Diplolonchidion – type locality for genus
  - †Diplolonchidion murryi – type locality for species
- †Diplomoceras
  - †Diplomoceras trabeatus
- †Discofascigera
- Discorbis
  - †Discorbis correcta
  - †Discorbis minima
- †Discoscaphites
  - †Discoscaphites conradi
  - †Discoscaphites erucoideus
- †Distefanella – or unidentified comparable form
- !-- Doswellia: Automatic taxobox --> †Doswellia
- †Douvilleiceras
  - †Douvilleiceras grandense
  - †Douvilleiceras mammillatum
  - †Douvilleiceras offarcinatum – or unidentified comparable form
  - †Douvilleiceras orbignyi – or unidentified comparable form
  - †Douvilleiceras quitmanense
  - †Douvilleiceras rex
  - †Douvilleiceras spathi
- †Douvillelia – tentative report
  - †Douvillelia skeltoni
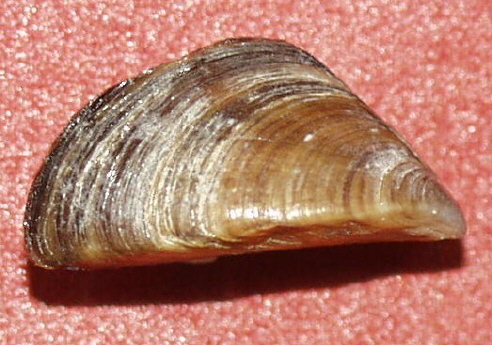
- Shell of a Dreissena freshwater mussel
  †Dreissena
  - †Dreissena tippana
- †Drepanocheilus
  - †Drepanocheilus corbetensis
  - †Drepanocheilus cuthandensis
  - †Drepanocheilus texanus
- †Drepanochilus
  - †Drepanochilus corbetensis
  - †Drepanochilus davidsi
  - †Drepanochilus martini
  - †Drepanochilus texanus
  - †Drepanochilus triliratus
- †Drilluta
  - †Drilluta brevispira
  - †Drilluta crassicostata
  - †Drilluta crassicostata longa
  - †Drilluta distans
  - †Drilluta major – or unidentified comparable form
  - †Drilluta paucicostata
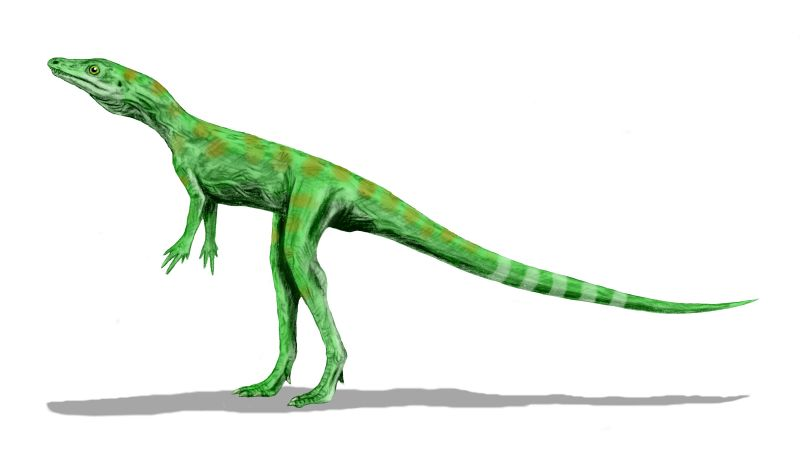
- Restoration of the Late Triassic dinosaur relative Dromomeron
  †Dromomeron
  - †Dromomeron gregorii – type locality for species
- †Dryptosaurus
- †Dufrenoyia
  - †Dufrenoyia justinae
  - †Dufrenoyia rebeccae
- †Durania

== E ==
- †Echinocorys
  - †Echinocorys texanus
- †Ecphora
  - †Ecphora proquadricostata
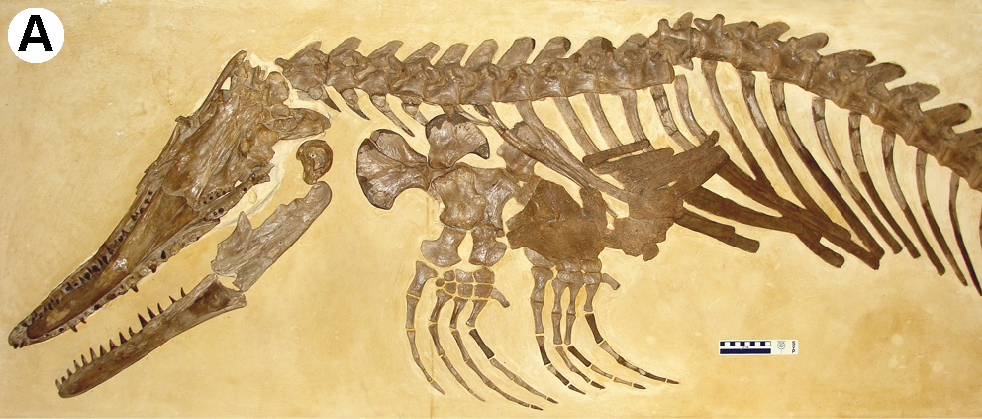
- Fossilized partial skeleton of the Late Cretaceous mosasaur Ectenosaurus
  †Ectenosaurus
- †Edmontonia – or unidentified comparable form
- †Elea – tentative report
- †Elephantaria
  - †Elephantaria simondsi – type locality for species
- †Ellipsoscapha
  - †Ellipsoscapha mortoni
  - †Ellipsoscapha striatella
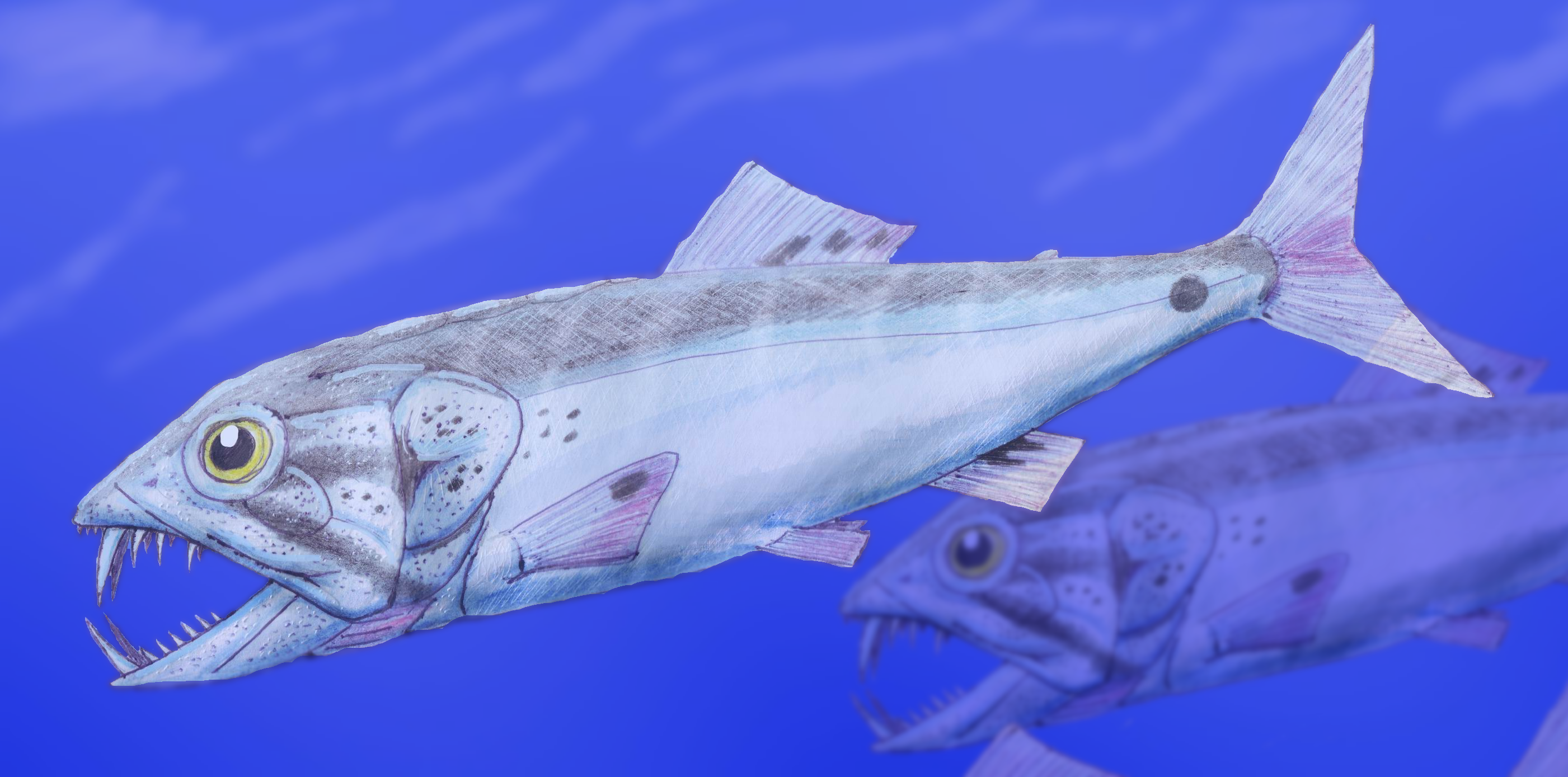
- Restoration of the Early Cretaceous-Eocene bony fish Enchodus, or the "saber-toothed herring"
  †Enchodus
- †Endoplocytia
- †Endoptygma
  - †Endoptygma leprosa
- †Endostoma
  - †Endostoma mexicana – or unidentified comparable form
- †Engonoceras
  - †Engonoceras complicatum
  - †Engonoceras elegans
  - †Engonoceras gibbosum
  - †Engonoceras hilli
  - †Engonoceras retardum
  - †Engonoceras serpentinum
  - †Engonoceras stolleyi
  - †Engonoceras subjectum – or unidentified related form
- †Enoploclytia
  - †Enoploclytia triglypta
  - †Enoploclytia wintoni
- †Entolium
- †Eoacteon
  - †Eoacteon linteus
- †Eodouvilleiceras
- †Eomunidopsis
  - †Eomunidopsis limonitica
- Eonavicula
  - †Eonavicula newspecies1
  - †Eonavicula rostellata
- †Eoradiolites
  - †Eoradiolites davidsoni
- †Eosiderastrea
  - †Eosiderastrea cuyleri – type locality for species
- †Eoursivivas
  - †Eoursivivas harveyi
- †Epiaster
  - †Epiaster whitei
- †Epiphaxum
  - †Epiphaxum labyrinthicum – type locality for species
- †Episcoposaurus – type locality for genus
  - †Episcoposaurus haplocerus – type locality for species
- †Epistomina
  - †Epistomina charlottae
  - †Epistomina lacunosa
- †Epistreptophyllum
  - †Epistreptophyllum boesei – type locality for species
  - †Epistreptophyllum budaensis – type locality for species
  - †Epistreptophyllum shumardi – type locality for species
- †Epitonium
  - †Epitonium sillimani
- †Etea
  - †Etea corsicana
  - †Etea peasi
- †Ethmocardium
  - †Ethmocardium welleri
- †Eubaculites
  - †Eubaculites carinatus
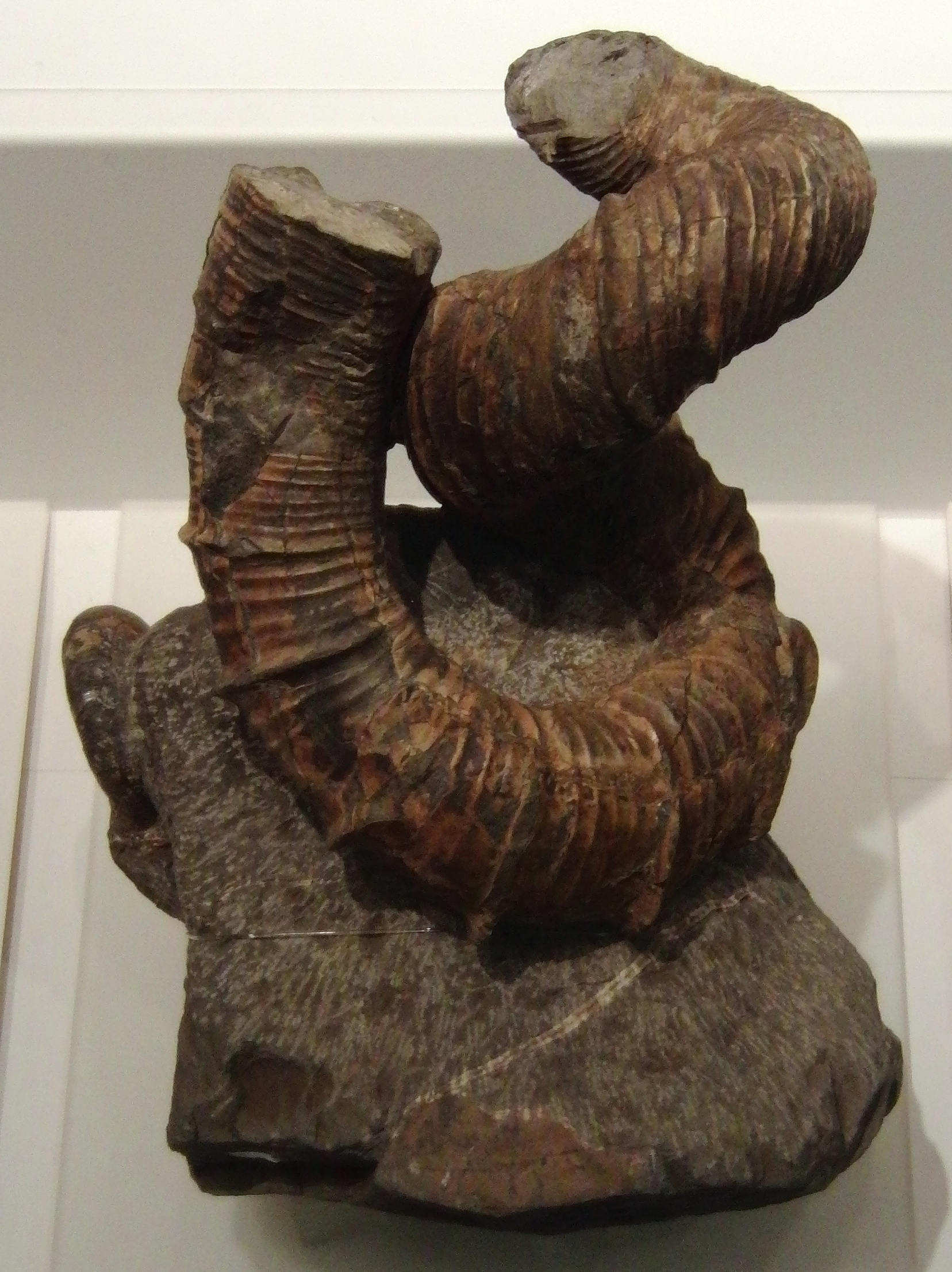
- Fossilized shell of the Late Cretaceous ammonoid cephalopod Eubostrychoceras
  †Eubostrychoceras
  - †Eubostrychoceras reevesi
- †Eucalycoceras
  - †Eucalycoceras templetonense – type locality for species
- †Eufistulana
  - †Eufistulana ripleyana
- †Eufistulina
  - †Eufistulina ripleyana
- †Eugyra
  - †Eugyra cuyleri – type locality for species
- †Euhoplites – tentative report
- †Eulima
  - †Eulima clara
  - †Eulima laevigata
- †Euomphaloceras
  - †Euomphaloceras alvaradoense
  - †Euomphaloceras lonsdalei
  - †Euomphaloceras septemseriatum
- †Eupachydiscus
  - †Eupachydiscus grossouvrei
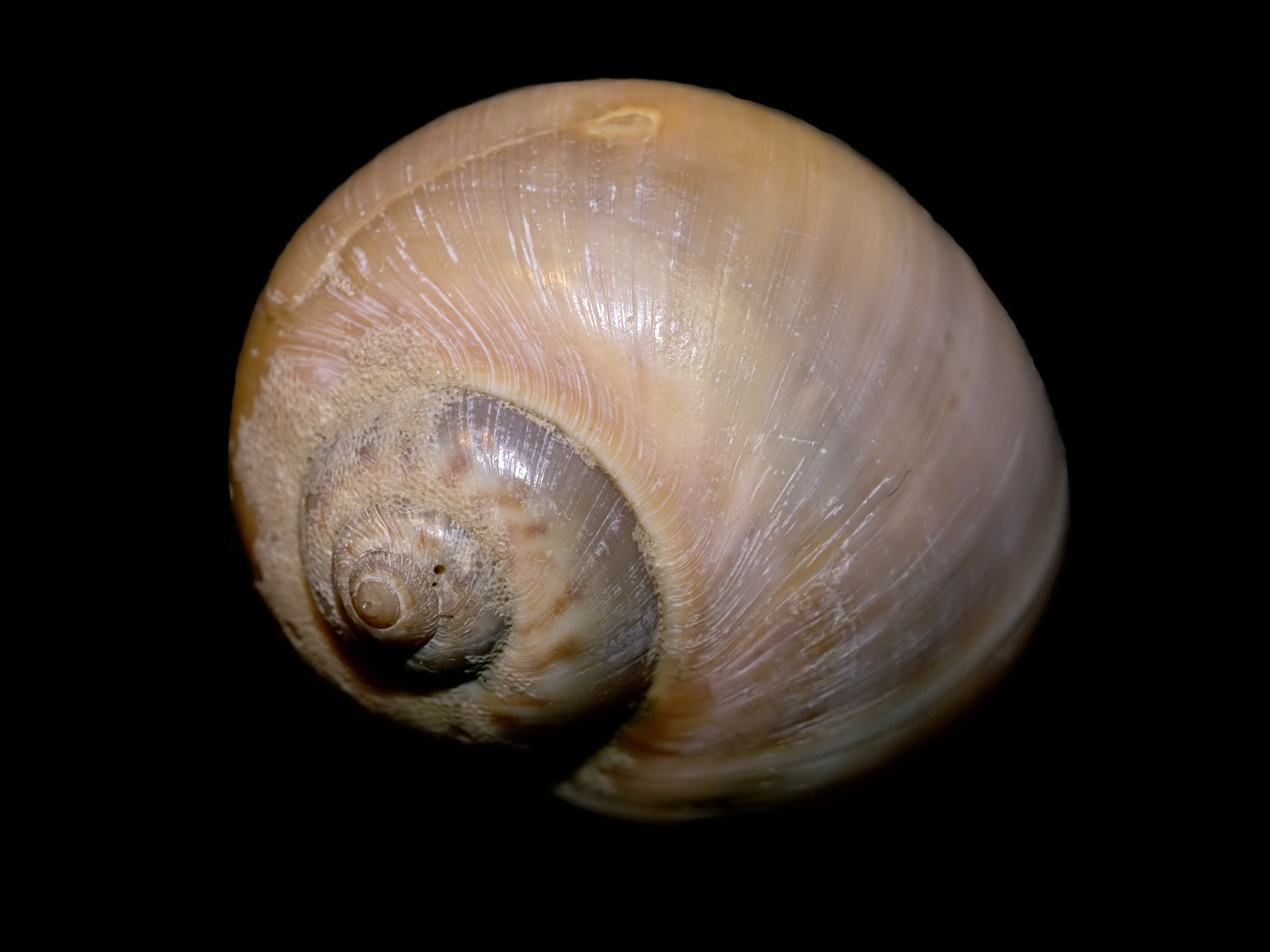
- Shell of a Euspira moon sea snail
  †Euspira
  - †Euspira dorothiensis
  - †Euspira dorothiensis pendula
  - †Euspira rectilabrum
  - †Euspira rectilabrum texanus
  - †Euspira rivulana
- Euthriofusus – or unidentified related form
  - †Euthriofusus convexus
- †Eutrephoceras
  - †Eutrephoceras dekayi
  - †Eutrephoceras perlatus
  - †Eutrephoceras planoventer
- †Ewingia – type locality for genus
  - †Ewingia problematica – type locality for species
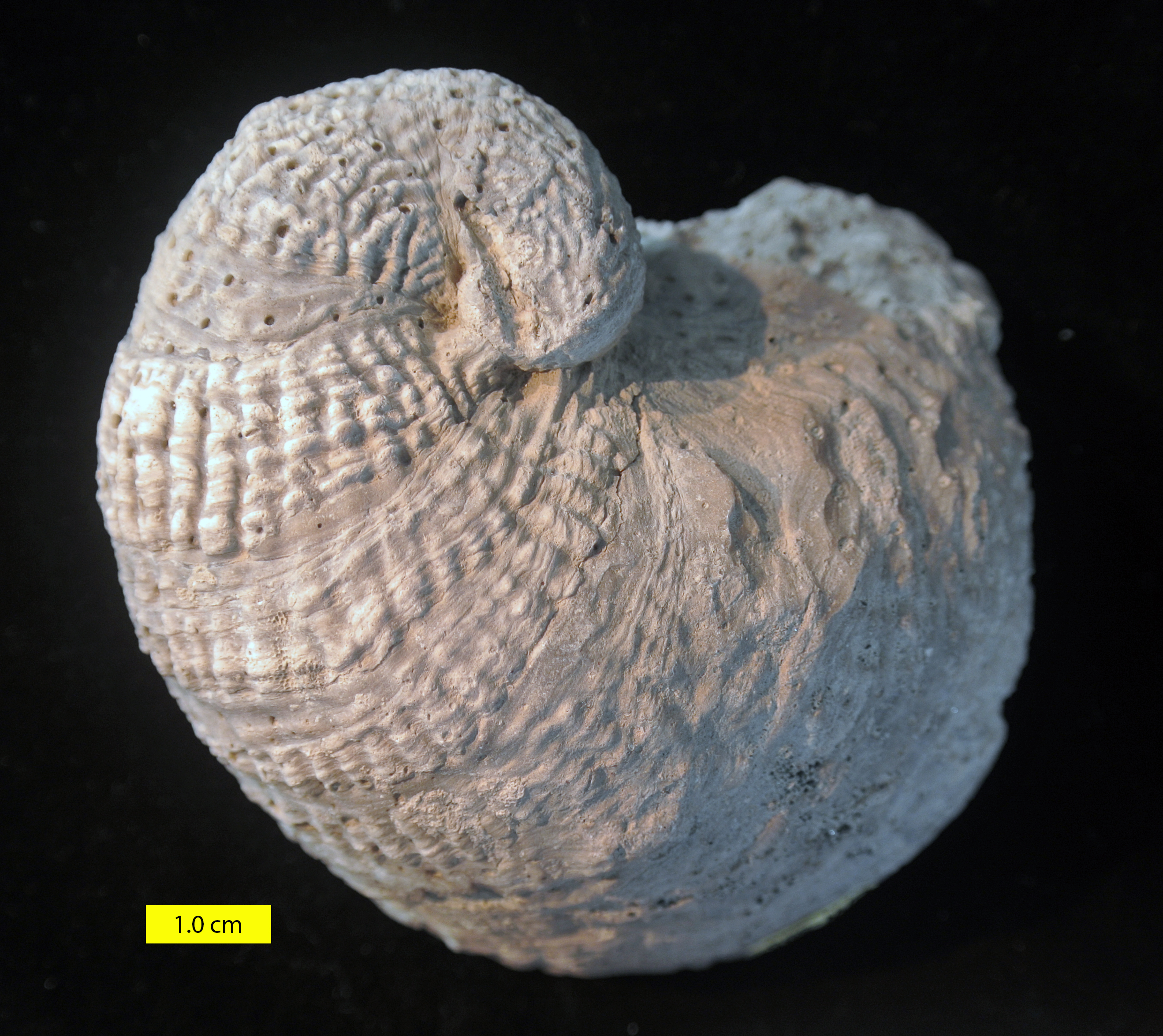
- Fossilized shell of the Jurassic-Cretaceous foam oyster Exogyra
  †Exogyra
  - †Exogyra americana
  - †Exogyra arientina
  - †Exogyra cancellata
  - †Exogyra columbella
  - †Exogyra columbella levis
  - †Exogyra costata
  - †Exogyra costata spinifera
  - †Exogyra erraticostata
  - †Exogyra potosina
  - †Exogyra spinifera
  - †Exogyra texana

== F ==
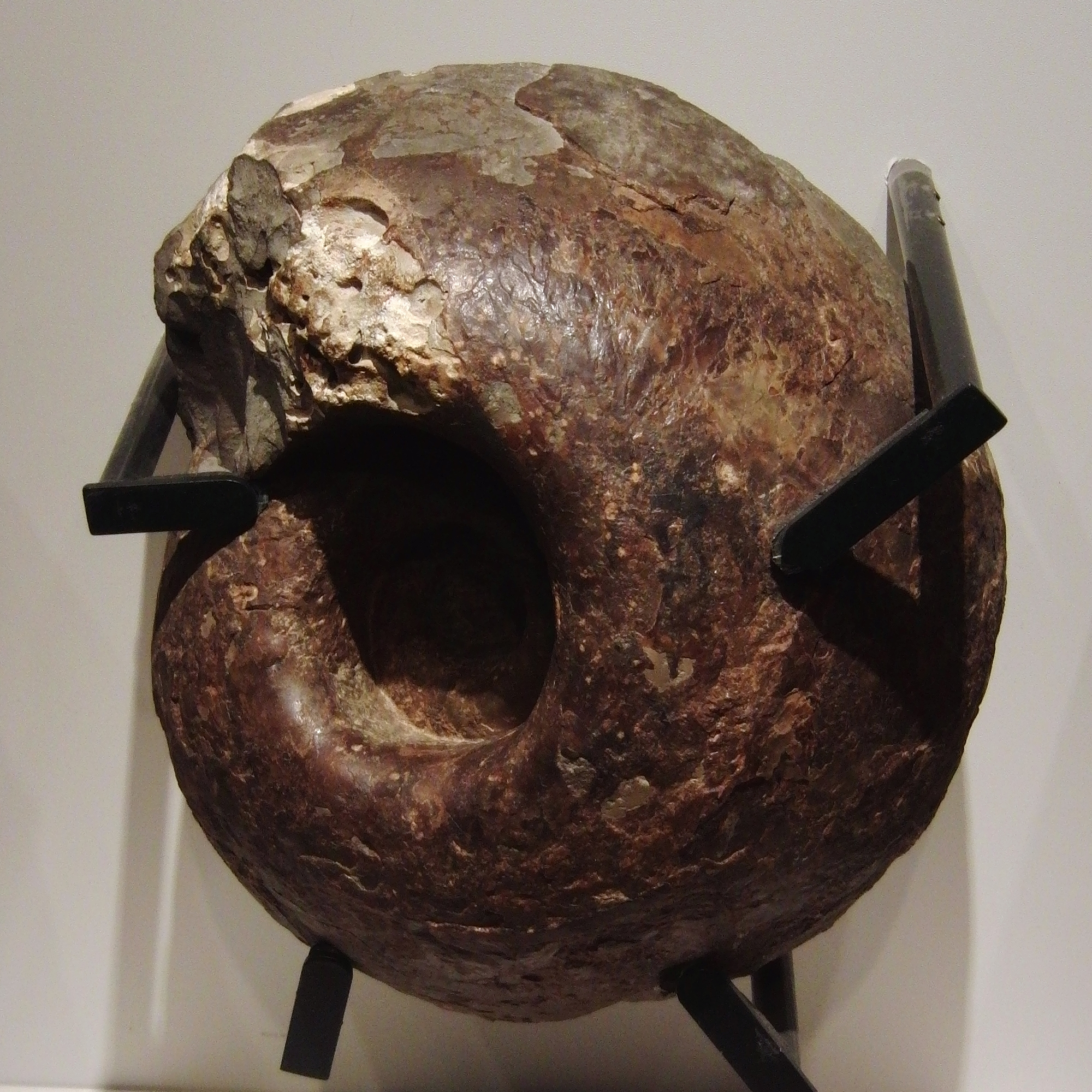
- Fossilized shell of the Late Cretaceous ammonoid cephalopod Fagesia
  †Fagesia
  - †Fagesia catinus
- †Faraudiella
  - †Faraudiella franciscoensis
  - †Faraudiella roermeri
- †Faujasia
  - †Faujasia chelonium – type locality for species
- †Favia
  - †Favia texana
- †Feldmannia
  - †Feldmannia wintoni
- †Ficheuria
  - †Ficheuria pernoni – or unidentified related form
- †Fictoacteon
  - †Fictoacteon alveolanus
  - †Fictoacteon humilispira
  - †Fictoacteon imlayi
  - †Fictoacteon saxanus
- Filisparsa
- †Flaventia
  - †Flaventia ludana
- †Flemingostrea
  - †Flemingostrea pratti
  - †Flemingostrea subspatula
  - †Flemingostrea subspatulata
- †Flexomornis – type locality for genus
  - †Flexomornis howei – type locality for species
- †Flickia
  - †Flickia simplex – type locality for species
- †Fomalhautia – type locality for genus
  - †Fomalhautia hortensae – type locality for species
- †Forbesiceras
  - †Forbesiceras beaumontianum
  - †Forbesiceras brundrettei
  - †Forbesiceras conlini
- †Forresteria
  - †Forresteria castellense – type locality for species
  - †Forresteria forresteri – type locality for species
  - †Forresteria sevierense – type locality for species
- †Frenelopsis
  - †Frenelopsis ramosissima
- †Fulgerca
  - †Fulgerca attenuata – or unidentified related form
  - †Fulgerca venusta
- †Fulpia
  - †Fulpia pinguis
- †Fungella
- †Fuscinapedis – type locality for genus
  - †Fuscinapedis woodbinensis – type locality for species
- †Fusimilis
  - †Fusimilis robustus
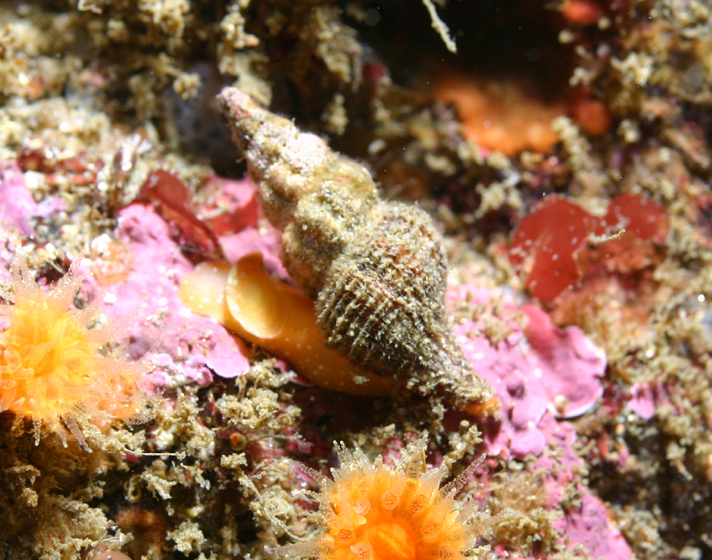
- A living Fusinus sea snail
  Fusinus
  - †Fusinus cornelianus
  - †Fusinus macnairyensis – or unidentified related form

== G ==
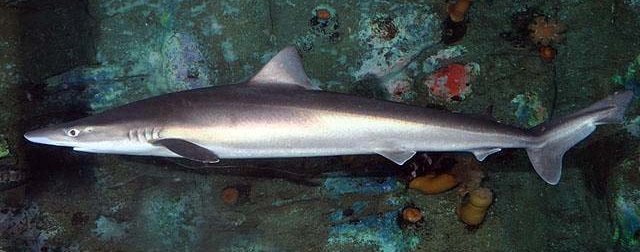
- A living Galeorhinus galeus school shark
  Galeorhinus
  - †Galeorhinus girardoti – or unidentified related form
- †Gallolestes
  - †Gallolestes agujaensis – type locality for species
- †Garramites
  - †Garramites nitidus
- Gastrochaena
- Gaudryina
  - †Gaudryina austinana
  - †Gaudryina cushmani
  - †Gaudryina ellisorae
- Gegania
  - †Gegania manzaneti
- †Geltena
  - †Geltena nitida
  - †Geltena obesa
  - †Geltena prunoides
  - †Geltena subcompressa
  - †Geltena subequilatera
  - †Geltena sybcompressa
- †Gerdalia
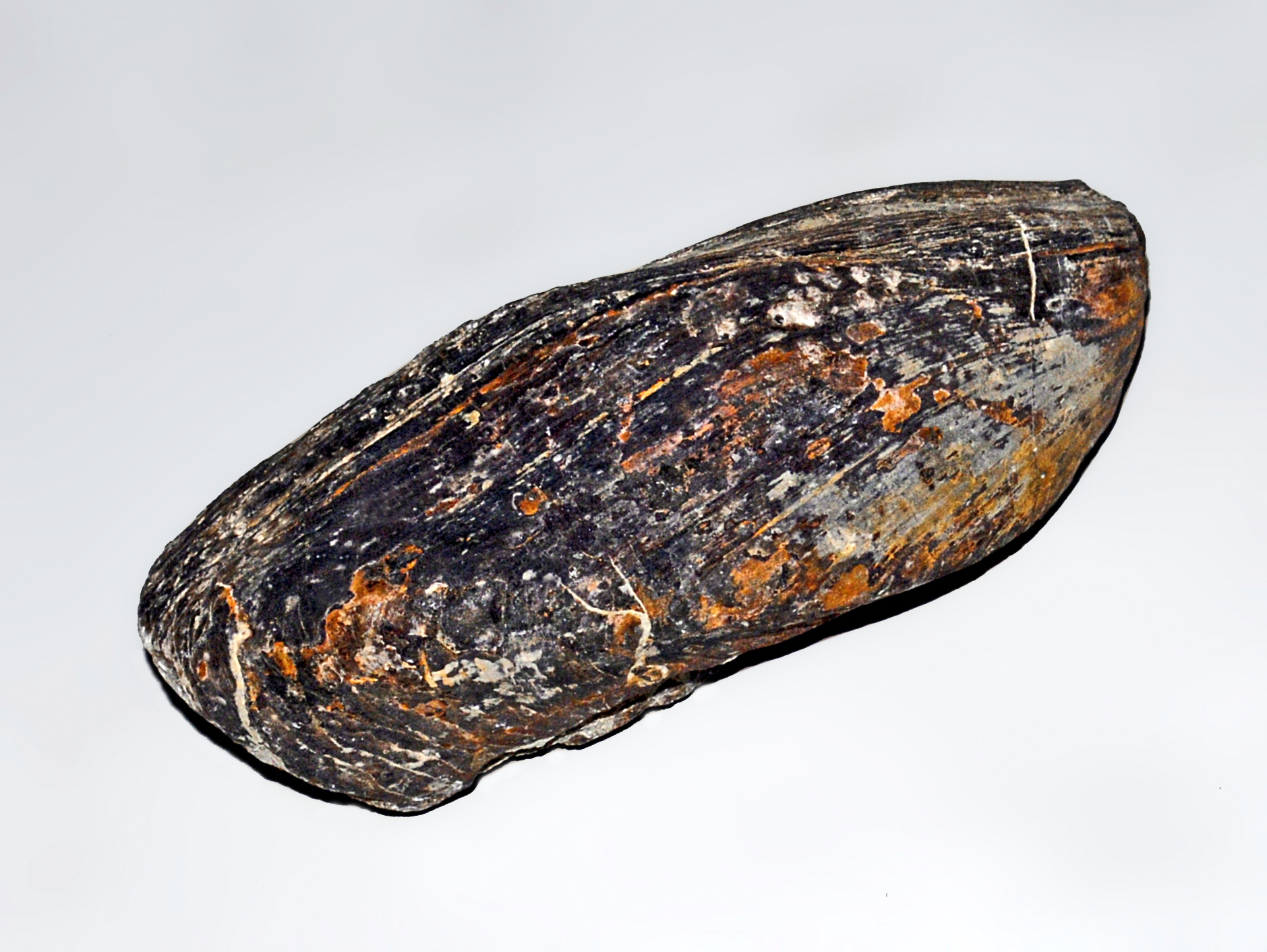
- Fossilized shell of the Carboniferous-Eocene bivalve Gervillia
  †Gervillia
  - †Gervillia bryani
  - †Gervillia wellsi – tentative report
- †Gervilliopsis
  - †Gervilliopsis ensiformis
  - †Gervilliopsis ensiformis extensa
  - †Gervilliopsis invaginata
- Ginglymostoma
- †Glenrosa
  - †Glenrosa pagiophylloides
  - †Glenrosa texensis
- †Globator
  - †Globator vaughani – type locality for species
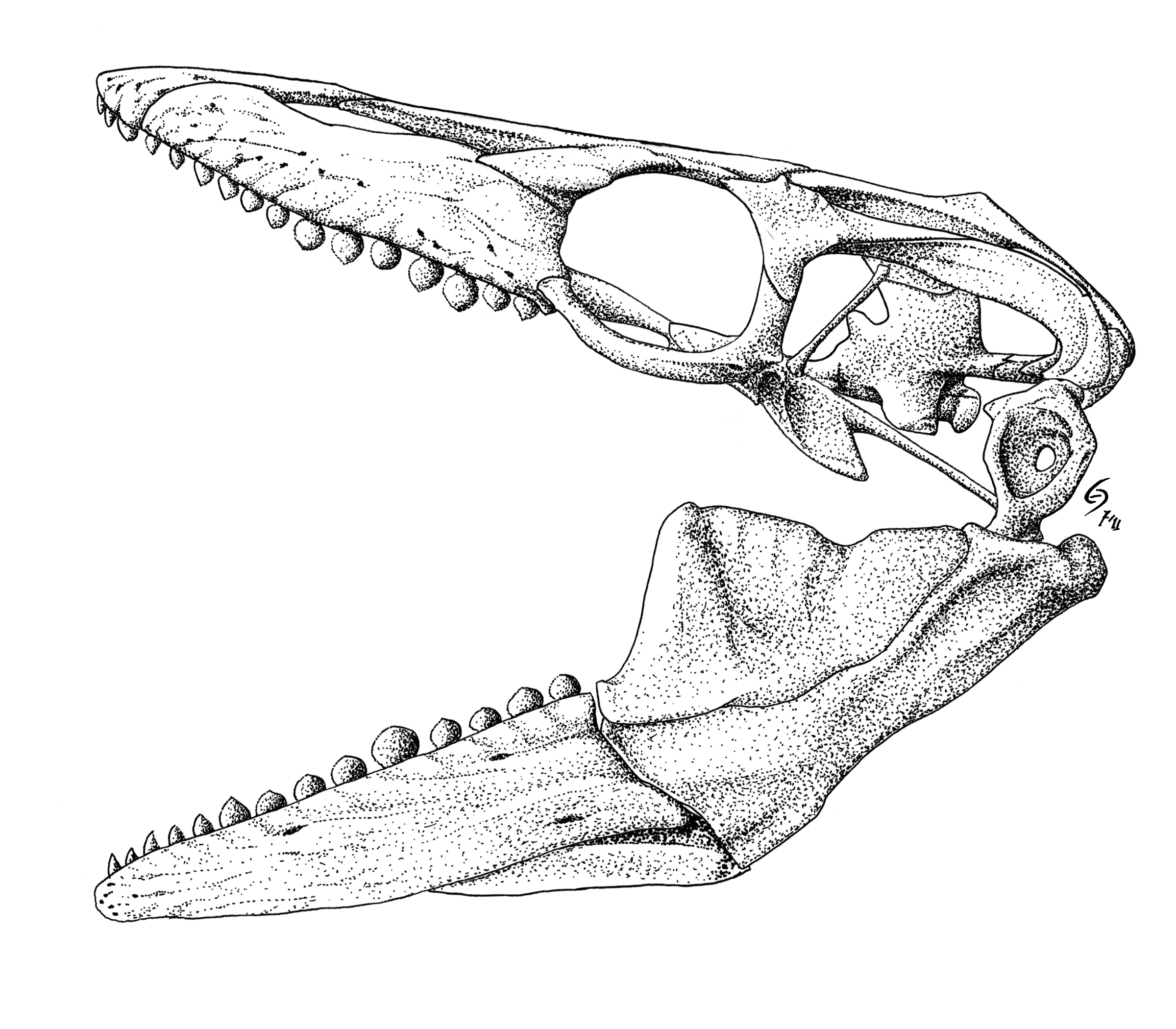
- Illustration of a reconstructed skull of the Late Cretaceous mosasaur Globidens
  †Globidens
  - †Globidens dakotensis
- Globigerina
  - †Globigerina cretacea
  - †Globigerina washitaensis
- Glossus
  - †Glossus bulbosa
  - †Glossus hendersoni
  - †Glossus irelandi
  - †Glossus shumardi
  - †Glossus slatana
  - †Glossus slatana parva
- Glycymeris
  - †Glycymeris rotundata
  - †Glycymeris rotundata kaufmanensis
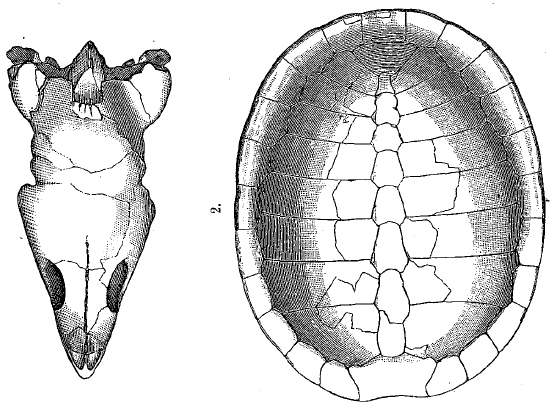
- Fossilized skull and shell of the Late Jurassic-Early Cretaceous turtle Glyptops
  †Glyptops – tentative report
- †Glyptoxoceras
  - †Glyptoxoceras texanum
- †Gobiates
- †Goniochasma
  - †Goniochasma scaphoides
- †Goniocylichna
- †Goniophorus
  - †Goniophorus scotti
- †Graciliala
  - †Graciliala calcaris
  - †Graciliala cooki
  - †Graciliala johnsoni – tentative report
- †Grammatodon
  - †Grammatodon adkinsi
  - †Grammatodon bowiei
- †Granocardium
  - †Granocardium bowenae
  - †Granocardium conradi
  - †Granocardium deltanum
  - †Granocardium dumosum
  - †Granocardium kuemmeli
  - †Granocardium kummeli
  - †Granocardium lowei
  - †Granocardium rossae
  - †Granocardium tholi
  - †Granocardium tippananum
- †Graphidula
  - †Graphidula gabrielensis – tentative report
  - †Graphidula hoggi
  - †Graphidula lynnensis
  - †Graphidula multicostata
  - †Graphidula terebriformis
- †Graptocarcinus
  - †Graptocarcinus texanus
- †Graysonia
  - †Graysonia bergquisti
- †Graysonites
  - †Graysonites adkinsi
  - †Graysonites wacoense
- †Gryphaea
  - †Gryphaea aucella – or unidentified related form
  - †Gryphaea gibberosa
  - †Gryphaea marcoui
  - †Gryphaea pitcheri
  - †Gryphaea washitaensis
- †Gryphaeostrea
  - †Gryphaeostrea vomer
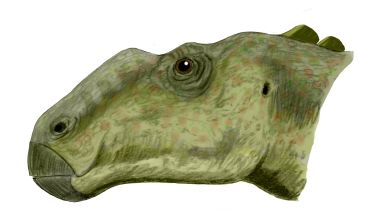
- Restorative portrait of the Late Cretaceous duck-billed dinosaur Gryposaurus.
  †Gryposaurus – tentative report
  - †Gryposaurus alsatei
- †Guembelina
  - †Guembelina globulosa
  - †Guembelina paucistriata
- †Gumbelina
- †Gymnentome
  - †Gymnentome valida
  - †Gymnentome valida brevis
- †Gypsichnites
  - †Gypsichnites titanopelopatidus
- Gyrodes
  - †Gyrodes abyssinus
  - †Gyrodes americanus
  - †Gyrodes major
  - †Gyrodes petrosus
  - †Gyrodes rotundus
  - †Gyrodes spillmani
  - †Gyrodes subcarinatus
  - †Gyrodes supraplicatus
  - †Gyrodes tramitensis
- †Gyronchus
  - †Gyronchus dumblei
- †Gyrostrea
  - †Gyrostrea cortex

== H ==
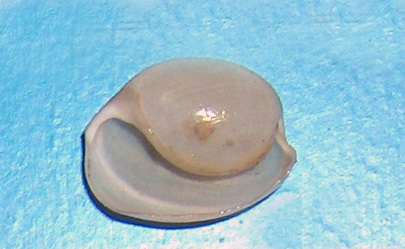
- Shell of Haminoea bubble shell sea snail
  Haminoea – tentative report
  - †Haminoea simpsonensis
- †Hamites
- †Hamrabatis
  - †Hamrabatis weltoni – type locality for species
- †Hamulus
  - †Hamulus huntensis
  - †Hamulus onyx
  - †Hamulus squamosus
- †Haplostiche
  - †Haplostiche texana
- †Haplovoluta
  - †Haplovoluta bicarinata
- †Harduinia
  - †Harduinia bexari
  - †Harduinia dalli
  - †Harduinia mortonis
- †Helicoceras
  - †Helicoceras navarroense
- †Helopanoplia
- Hemiaster
  - †Hemiaster benhurensis
  - †Hemiaster bexari
  - †Hemiaster jacksoni
  - †Hemiaster sabinal – type locality for species
  - †Hemiaster texanus
  - †Hemiaster wetherbyi
- †Hemicalypterus – tentative report
  - †Hemicalypterus weiri
- Hemicerithium
  - †Hemicerithium insigne
  - †Hemicerithium interlineatum
- †Hercorhynchus
  - †Hercorhynchus malleiformis
- †Hercorhyncus
  - †Hercorhyncus coronale
  - †Hercorhyncus malleiformis
  - †Hercorhyncus mundum
  - †Hercorhyncus nodosum
  - †Hercorhyncus tippanus
  - †Hercorhyncus vadosum
- †Heterocoenia – tentative report
  - †Heterocoenia hilli – type locality for species
  - †Heterocoenia washitaensis – type locality for species
- Heterodontus
  - †Heterodontus granti – type locality for species
- † Heteromorpha
  - †Heteromorpha ammonite
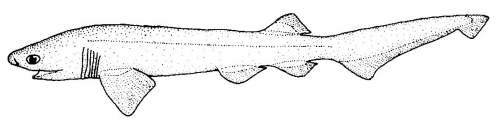
- Illustration of a living Hexanchus, or sixgill shark
  Hexanchus
- †Hillites
  - †Hillites multilirae
  - †Hillites septarianus
- †Hindeastraea
  - †Hindeastraea discoidea
- †Holaster
  - †Holaster simplex
- †Holoclemensia – type locality for genus
  - †Holoclemensia texana – type locality for species
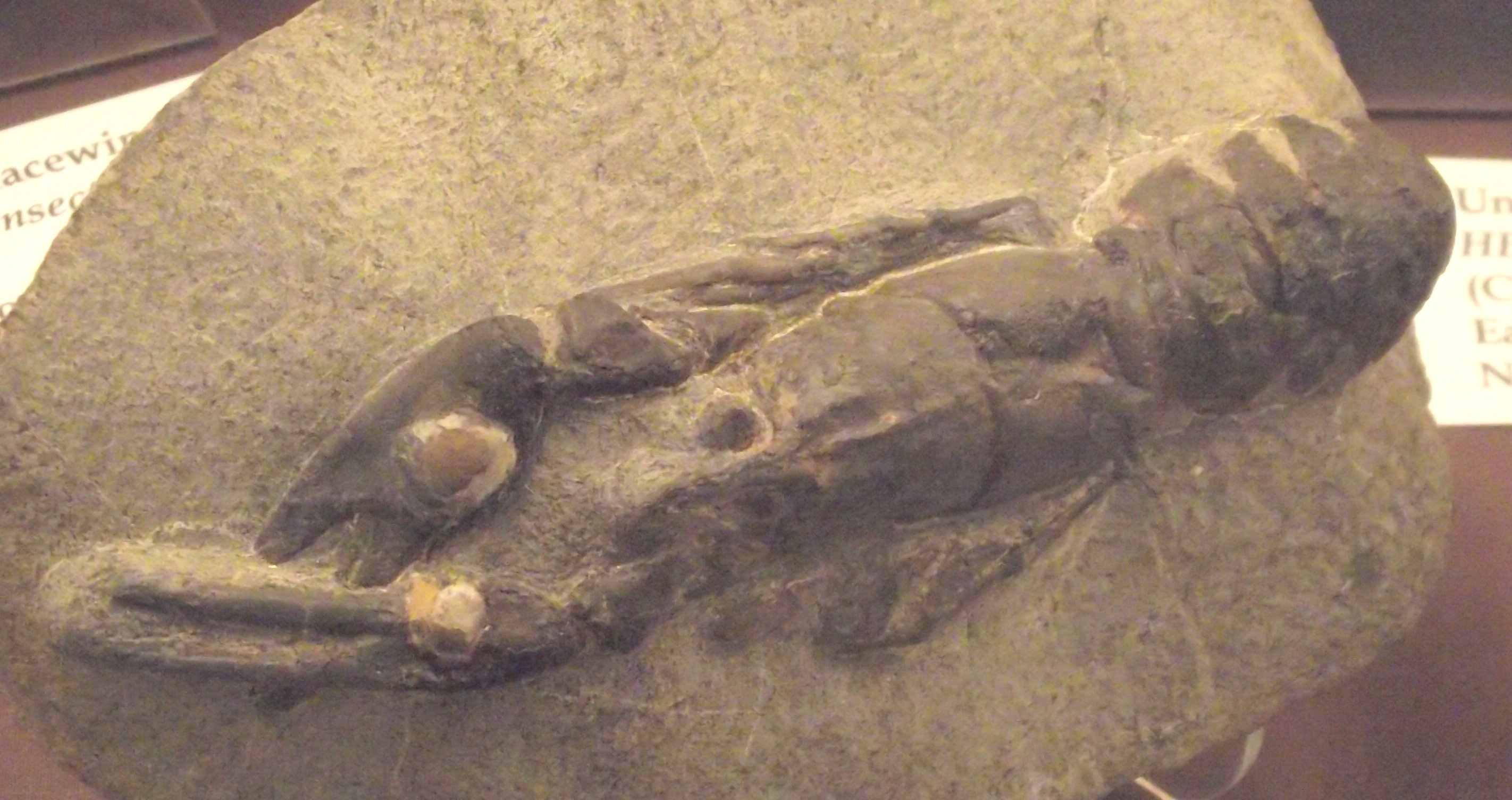
- Fossil of the Late Cretaceous lobster Hoploparia bearpawensis
  Homarus
  - †Homarus brittonetris
  - †Homarus davisi
  - †Homarus travisensis
- †Homoeosolen
- †Homomya
  - †Homomya thrusheri – tentative report
- †Hoplochelys
- †Hoploscaphites
  - †Hoploscaphites pumilis
- †Huetamia
  - †Huetamia buitronae
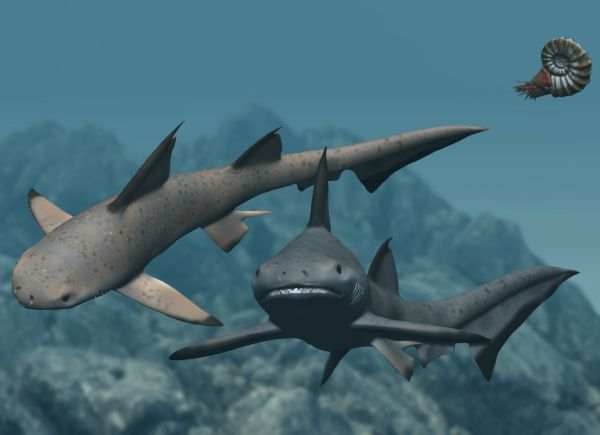
- Life restoration of two of the Permian-Late Cretaceous cartilaginous fish Hybodus
  --> †Hybodus
  - †Hybodus brevicostatus – or unidentified comparable form
  - †Hybodus butleri – type locality for species
- †Hydnophora – tentative report
  - †Hydnophora styriaca – type locality for species
- †Hydrotribulus
  - †Hydrotribulus asper
- †Hylaeobatis – or unidentified comparable form
  - †Hylaeobatis ornata
- †Hypacanthoplites
  - †Hypacanthoplites bakeri
  - †Hypacanthoplites chihuahuaensis
  - †Hypacanthoplites cragini
  - †Hypacanthoplites quitmanensis
  - †Hypacanthoplites rugosus
  - †Hypacanthoplites sellardsi
  - †Hypacanthoplites umbilicostatus
- †Hypolophus
  - †Hypolophus mcnultyi – type locality for species
- †Hypophylloceras
  - †Hypophylloceras tanit – or unidentified comparable form
- †Hypoturrilites
  - †Hypoturrilites youngi

== I ==
- †Ichthyodectes
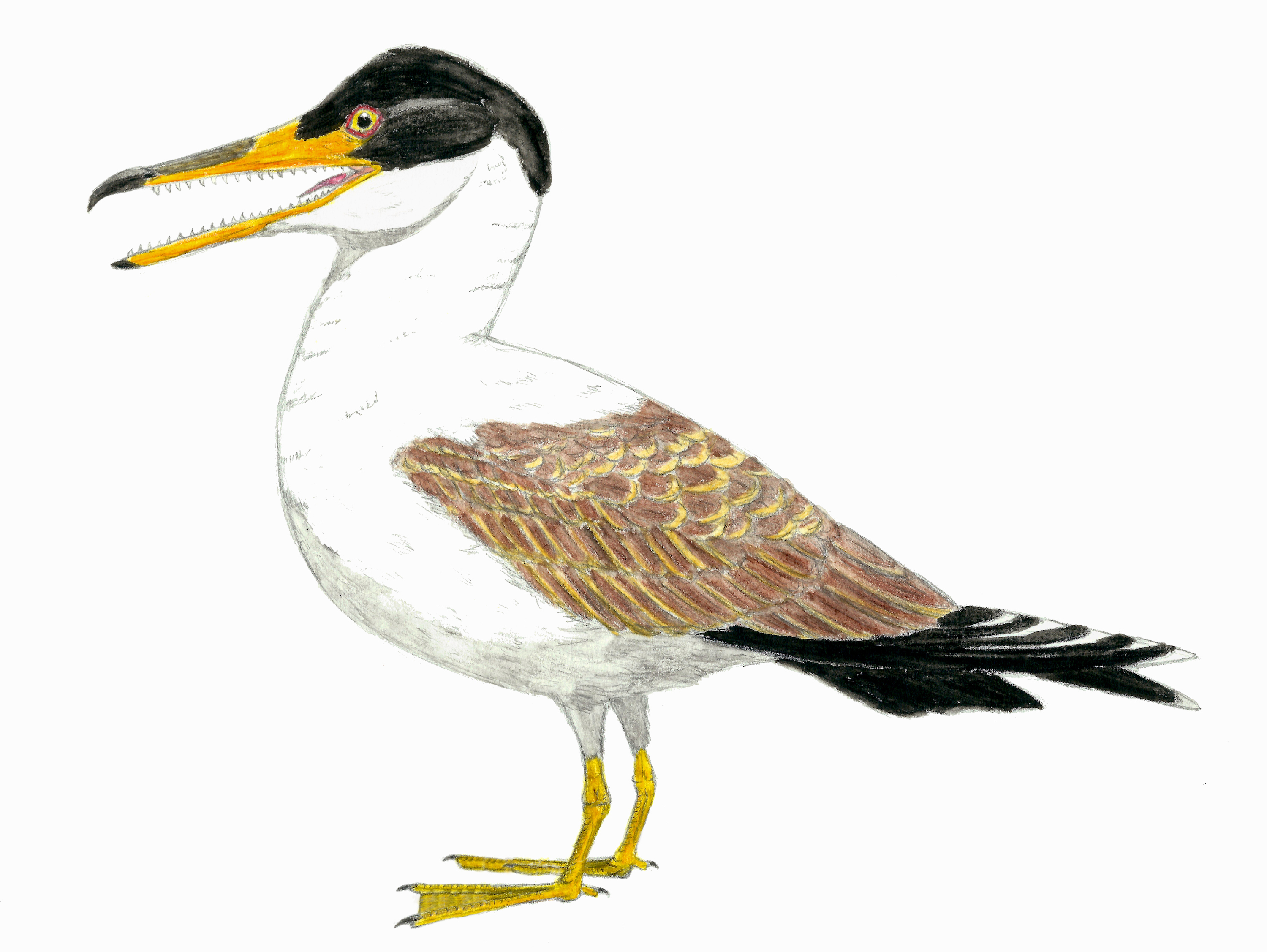
- Restoration of the Late Cretaceous toothed bird Ichthyornis
  †Ichthyornis
  - †Ichthyornis dispar
- †Idoceras
  - †Idoceras clarki
  - †Idoceras schucherti
- †Iguanodon – or unidentified comparable form
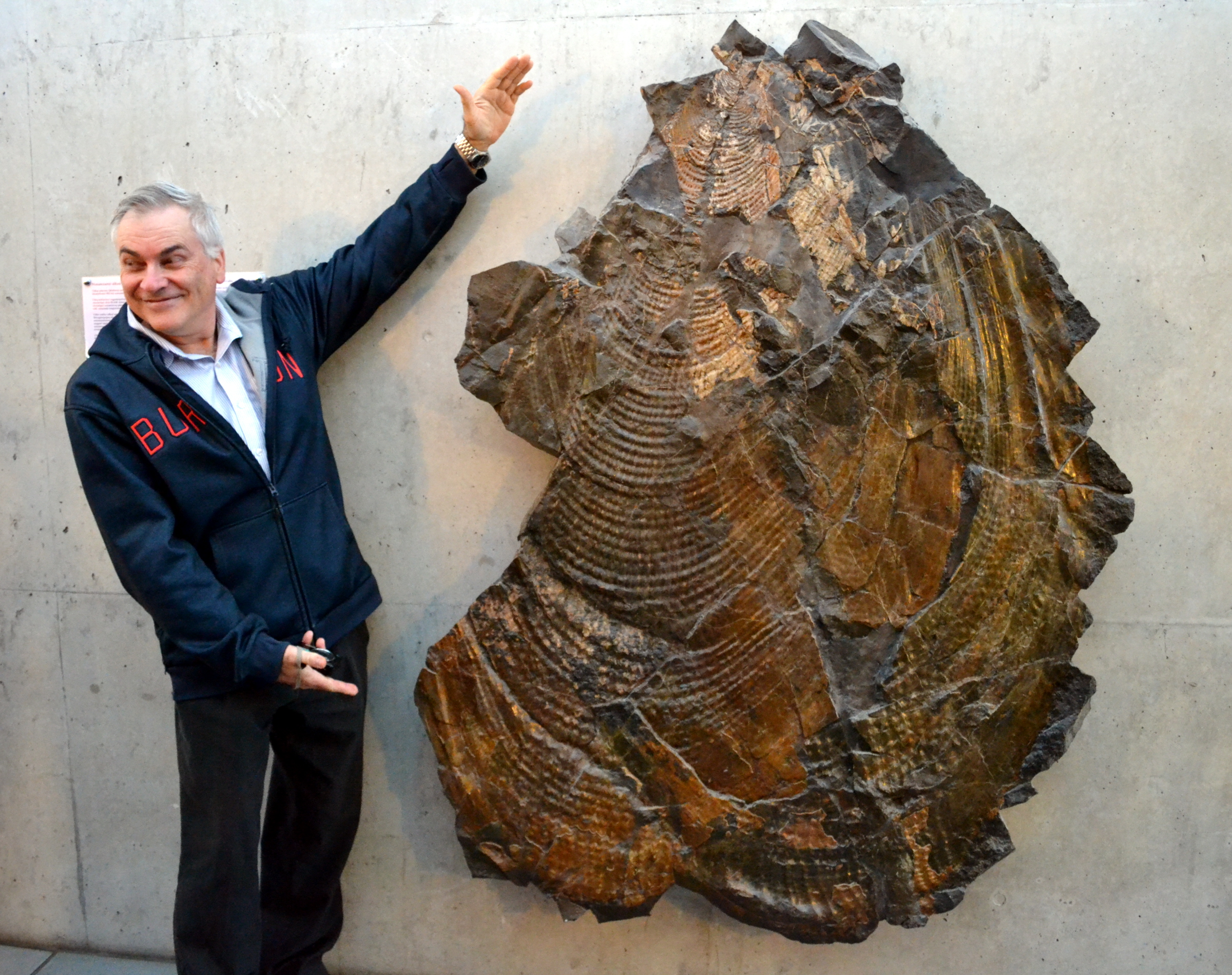
- Fossilized shell of the Early Jurassic-Late Cretaceous marine bivalve Inoceramus with a human indicating its size
  †Inoceramus
  - †Inoceramus anomalus – or unidentified comparable form
  - †Inoceramus arnoldi
  - †Inoceramus arvanus
  - †Inoceramus balticus
  - †Inoceramus biconstrictus
  - †Inoceramus cordiformis – or unidentified comparable form
  - †Inoceramus cummingsi
  - †Inoceramus deformis
  - †Inoceramus dimidius
  - †Inoceramus eulessanus
  - †Inoceramus fragilis
  - †Inoceramus prefragilis
  - †Inoceramus vanuxemi – tentative report
- †Irenesauripus
  - †Irenesauripus glenrosensis
- †Isastrea
  - †Isastrea whitneyi – type locality for species
- †Ischyrhiza
  - †Ischyrhiza avonicola
  - †Ischyrhiza mira
  - †Ischyrhiza monasterica – type locality for species
- †Isomicraster
  - †Isomicraster danei
  - †Isomicraster rossi – type locality for species

== J ==
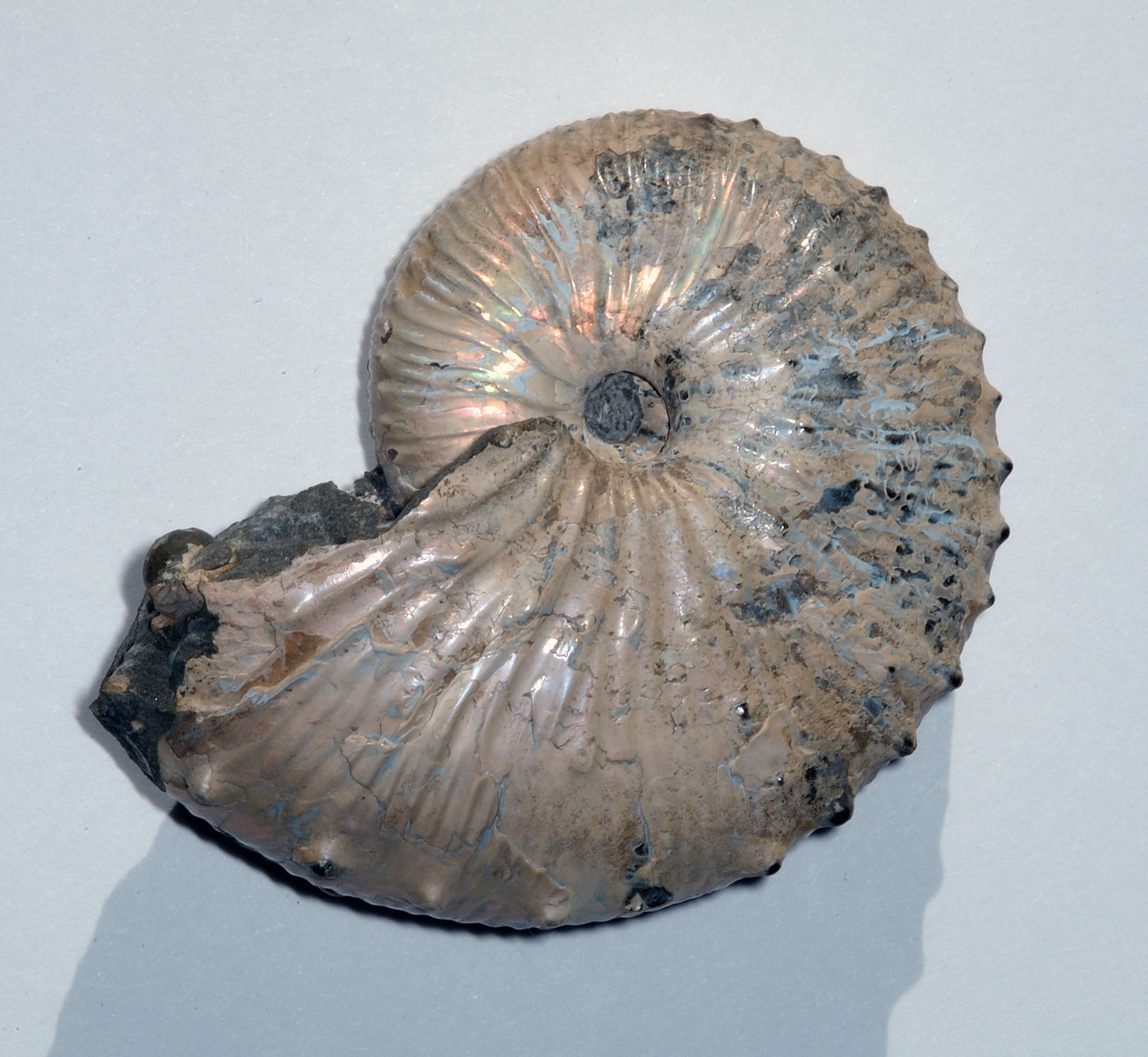
- Fossilized shell of the Late Cretaceous ammonoid cephalopod Jeletzkytes
  †Jeletzkytes
  - †Jeletzkytes brevis
- Juliacorbula
  - †Juliacorbula linteroidea
  - †Juliacorbula monmouthensis

== K ==
- †Kamerunoceras
  - †Kamerunoceras calvertense
  - †Kamerunoceras eschii – or unidentified comparable form
- †Kasanskyella
  - †Kasanskyella cuchillensis – tentative report
  - †Kasanskyella fosteri
  - †Kasanskyella spathi
  - †Kasanskyella whitneyi – tentative report
- †Kazanskyella
  - †Kazanskyella cuchillense
  - †Kazanskyella fosteri
  - †Kazanskyella minima
  - †Kazanskyella trinitensis
  - †Kazanskyella whitneyi
- †Kermackia – type locality for genus
  - †Kermackia texana – type locality for species
- †Kimbleia
  - †Kimbleia albrittoni
  - †Kimbleia capacis
- †Koskinonodon – type locality for genus
  - †Koskinonodon perfectus – type locality for species
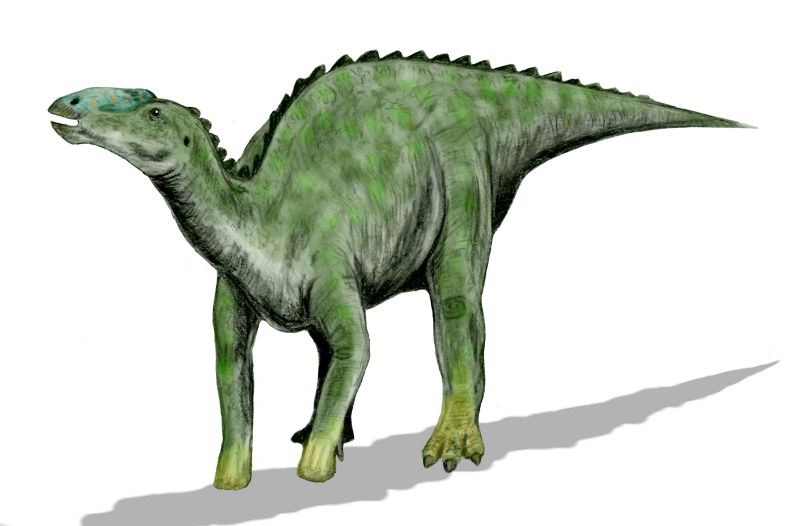
- Life restoration of the Late Cretaceous duck-billed dinosaur Kritosaurus
  †Kritosaurus

== L ==
- †Laevigyra
  - †Laevigyra dhondtae
- †Lamellaerhynchia
  - †Lamellaerhynchia indi – type locality for species
  - †Lamellaerhynchia viae – type locality for species
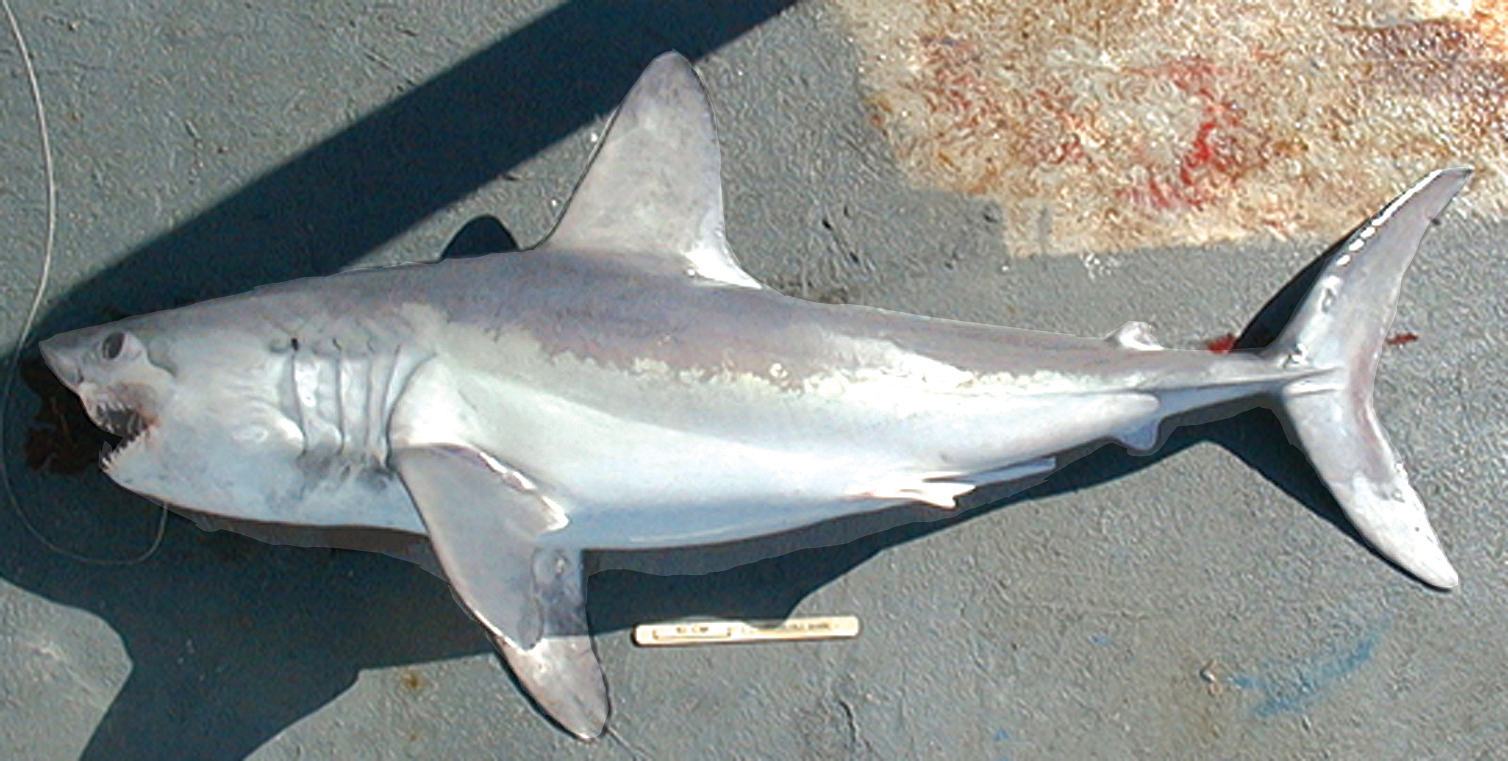
- A modern Lamna mackerel shark
  Lamna
  - †Lamna sulcata – or unidentified related form
- †Lanieria
  - †Lanieria uvaldana – type locality for species
- †Lasalichthys
  - †Lasalichthys hillsi
- Laternula
  - †Laternula bartoni
  - †Laternula johnsonana
  - †Laternula robusta
  - †Laternula sublevis
  - †Laternula sulcatina
  - †Laternula tofana
  - †Laternula virgata
- †Latiala
  - †Latiala lobata
- †Latiastrea
  - †Latiastrea whitneyi
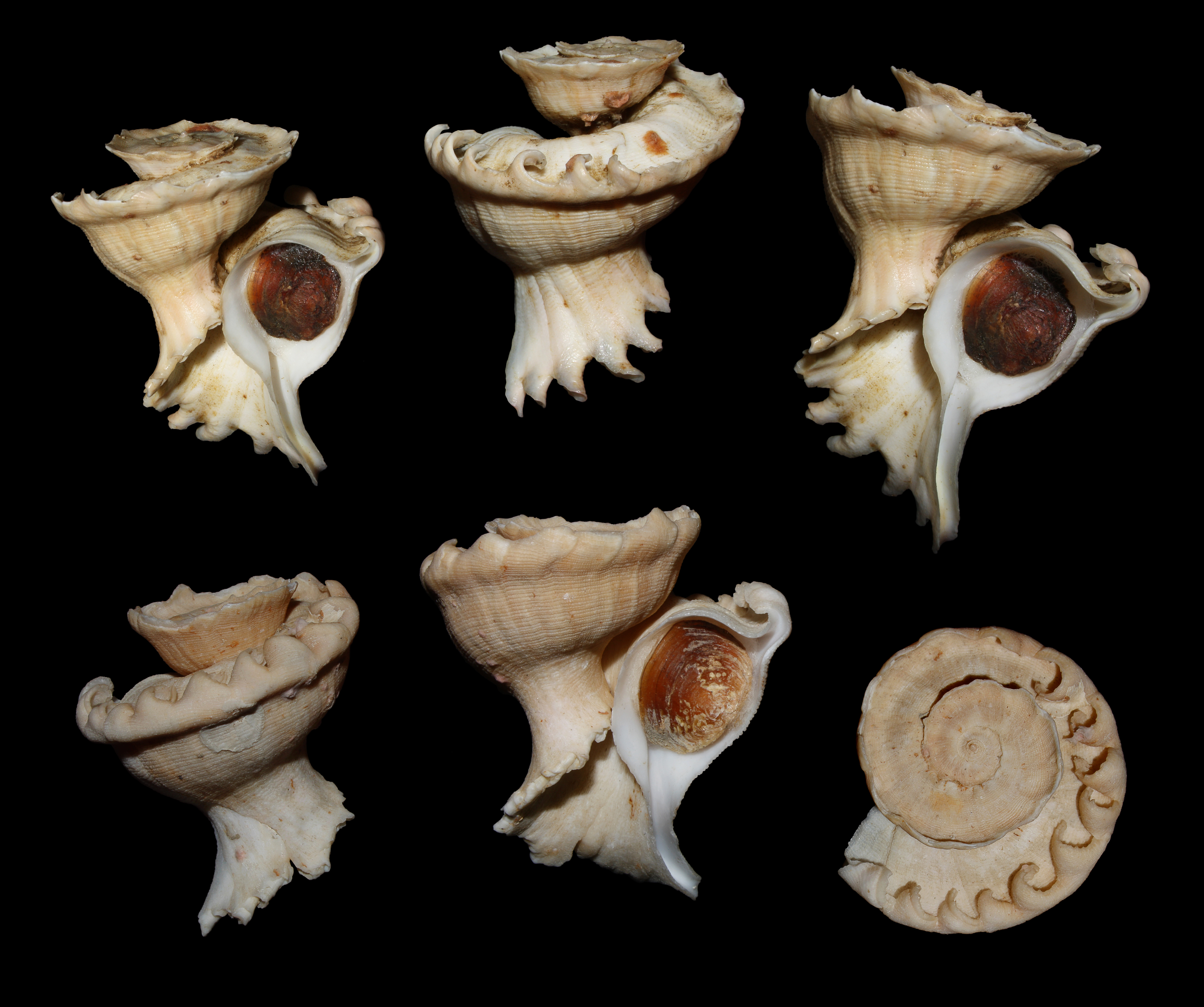
- Shells in multiple views of Latiaxis coral sea snails
  Latiaxis
- †Latiscopus – type locality for genus
  - †Latiscopus disjunctus – type locality for species
- †Laxispira
  - †Laxispira lumbricalis
  - †Laxispira monilifera
- †Legumen
  - †Legumen ellipticum
  - †Legumen ligula
- Lenticulina
  - †Lenticulina cyprina
  - †Lenticulina gaultina
- †Lepidotes
- Lepisosteus
- †Leptarbacia
  - †Leptarbacia argutus
- Leptomaria
  - †Leptomaria austinensis
  - †Leptomaria robusta

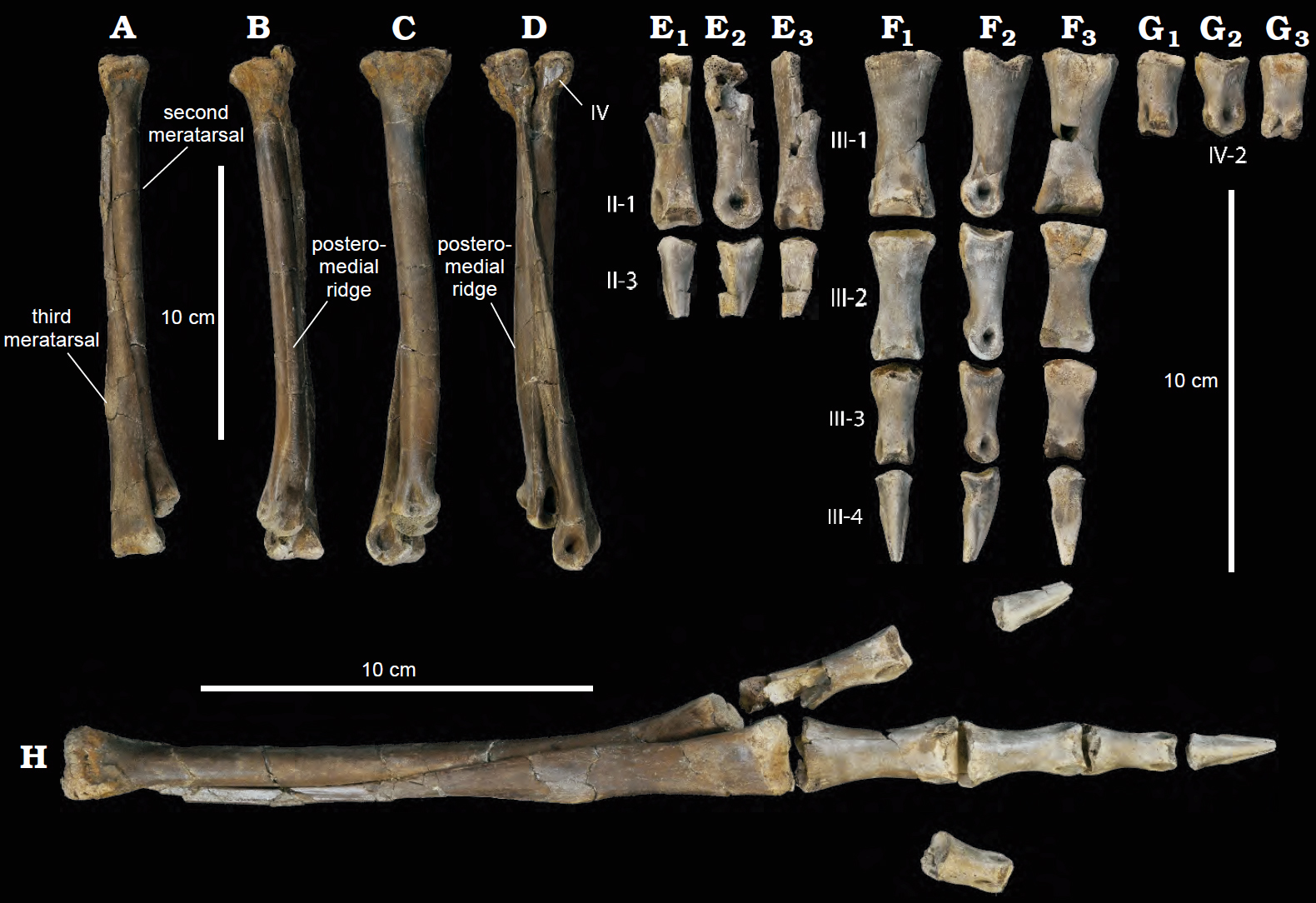
Fossilized foot bones of the Late Cretaceous oviraptorosaur Leptorhynchos

†Leptorhynchos – type locality for genus

  - †Leptorhynchos gaddisi – type locality for species
- †Leptosolen
  - †Leptosolen angustus
  - †Leptosolen biplicata
  - †Leptosolen levis
  - †Leptosolen linguliformis
  - †Leptosolen quadrilaterus
  - †Leptosolen quadriliratus
- †Leptostyrax
  - †Leptostyrax bicuspidatus
  - †Leptostyrax macrorhiza
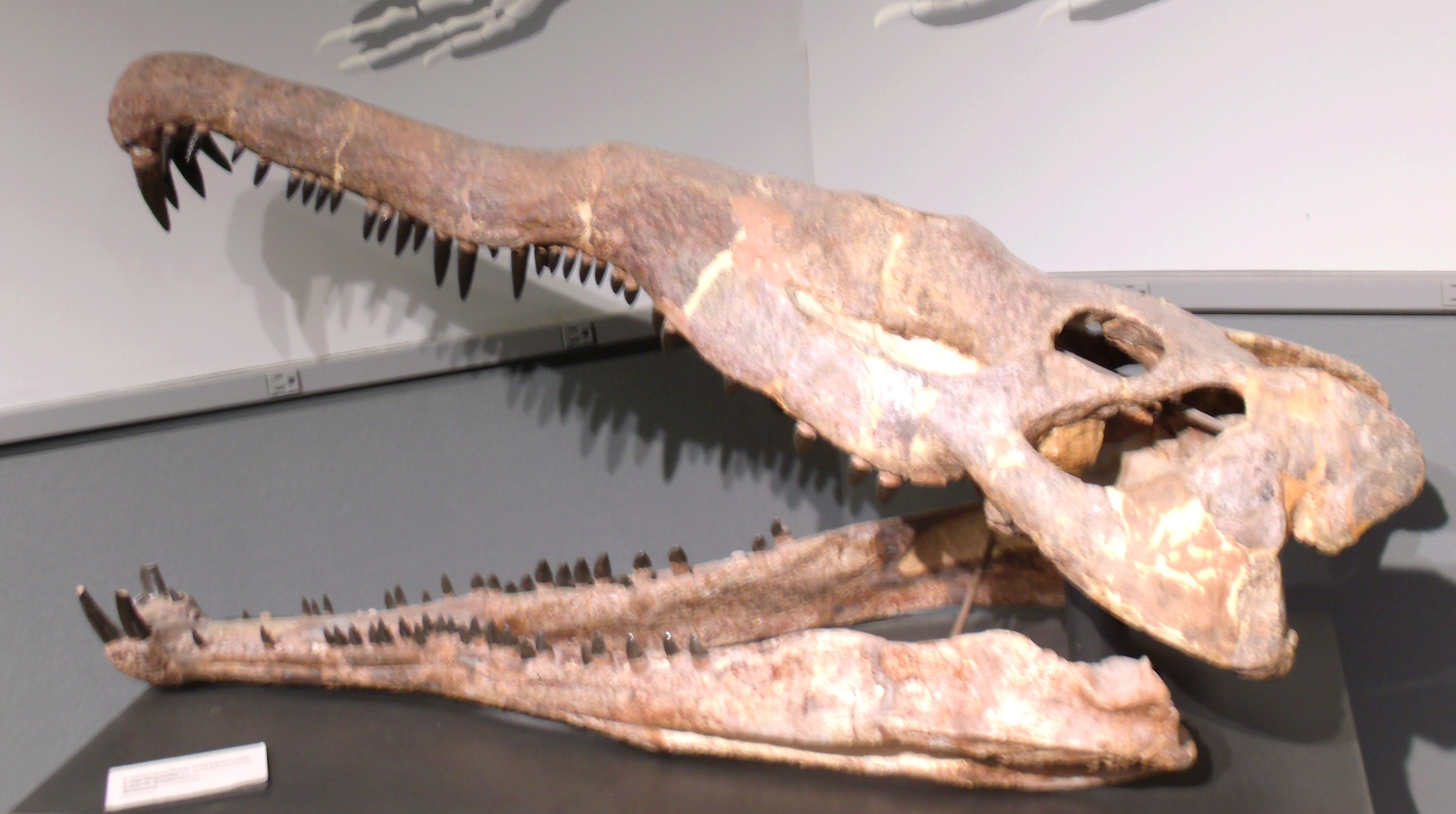
- Fossilized skull of the Late Triassic phytosaur Leptosuchus
  †Leptosuchus
  - †Leptosuchus crosbiensis – type locality for species
  - †Leptosuchus imperfecta – type locality for species
  - †Leptosuchus studeri – type locality for species
- †Levicerithium
  - †Levicerithium altum
  - †Levicerithium basicostae
  - †Levicerithium breviforme
  - †Levicerithium microlirae – tentative report
  - †Levicerithium planum
  - †Levicerithium timberanum
- †Lewesiceras
- †Lewyites
  - †Lewyites clinensis
- †Leyvachelys
  - †Leyvachelys cipadi
- †Libognathus – type locality for genus
  - †Libognathus sheddi – type locality for species
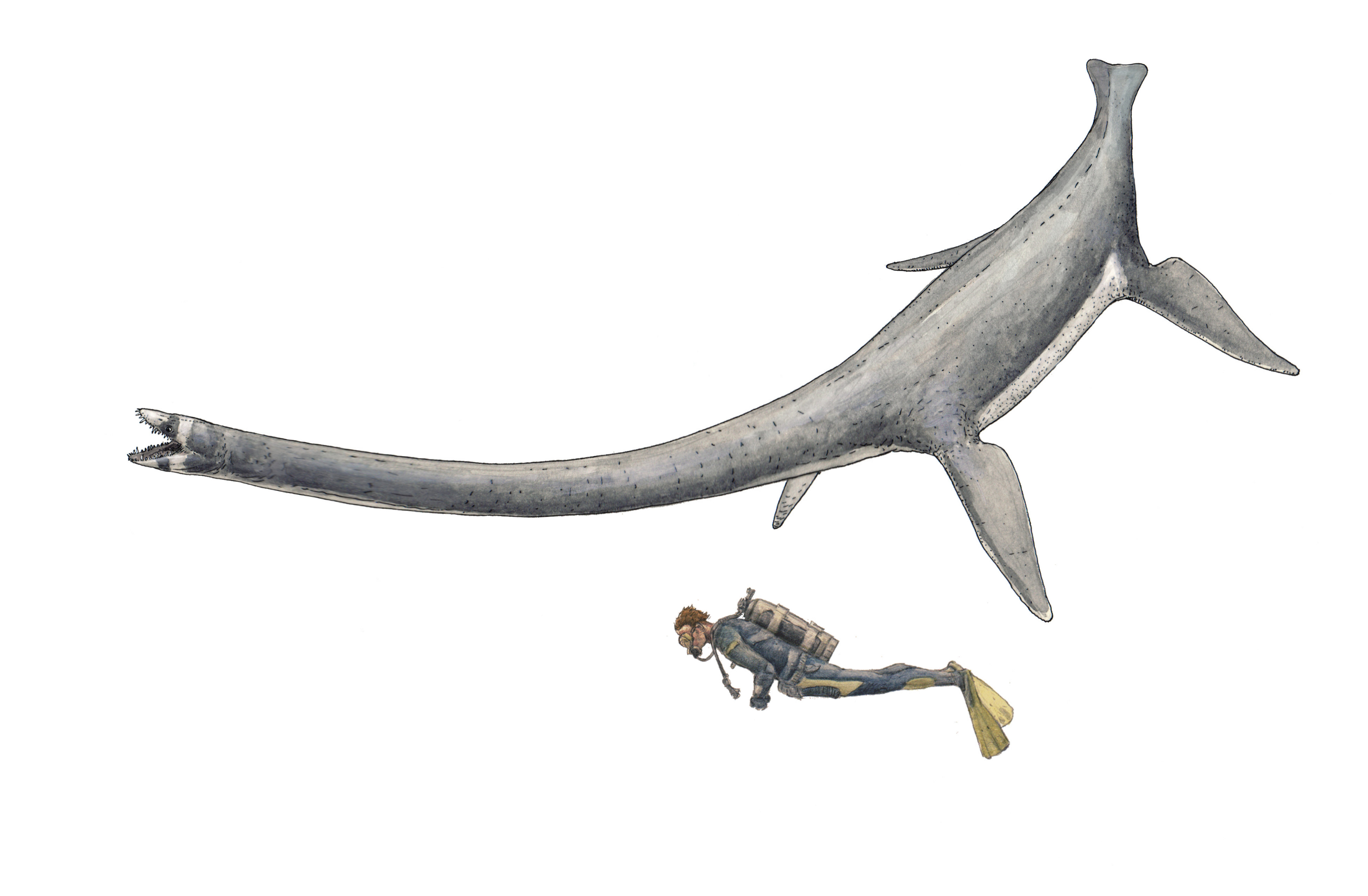
- Life restoration of the Late Cretaceous plesiosaur Libonectes with an anachronistic scuba diver to scale
  †Libonectes
  - †Libonectes morgani – type locality for species
- Lima
  - †Lima acutilineata texana
  - †Lima coahuilensis
  - †Lima cokei
  - †Lima deatsvillensis
  - †Lima generosa
  - †Lima geronimioensis
  - †Lima geronimoensis
  - †Lima guadalupensis
  - †Lima pelagica
  - †Lima wacoensis
- Limatula
  - †Limatula acutilineata
- Limea
  - †Limea reticulata
- Limopsis
  - †Limopsis meeki
- †Linearia
  - †Linearia crebelli
- †Linearis
  - †Linearis concentrica
  - †Linearis metastriata
  - †Linearis navarroana
  - †Linearis pectinis
  - †Linearis wieserae
- Lingula
  - †Lingula subspatulata
- †Linter
  - †Linter acutata
- †Linthia
  - †Linthia variabilis
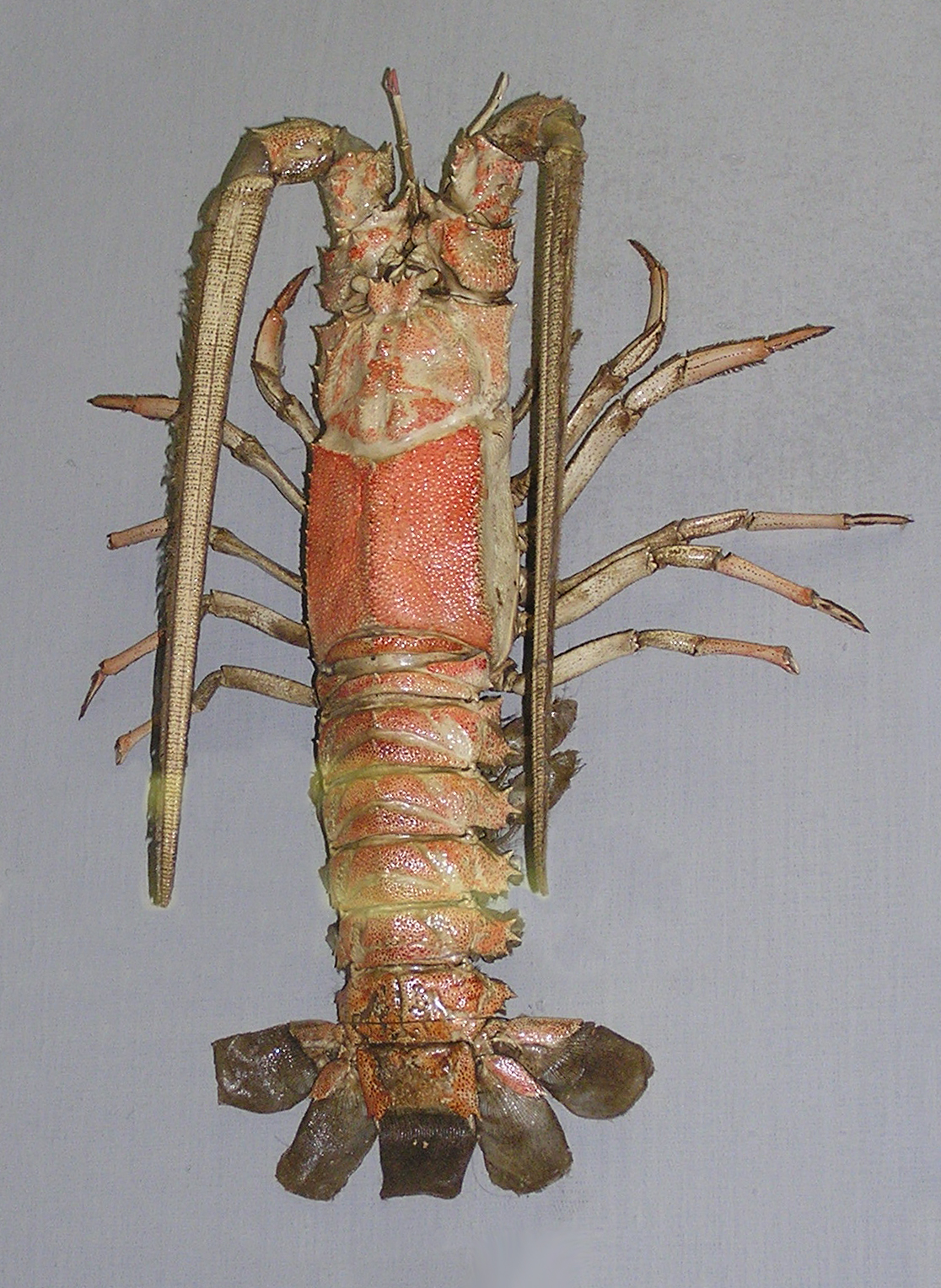
- A modern Linuparus spiny lobster
  Linuparus
  - †Linuparus adkinsi
  - †Linuparus grimmeri
  - †Linuparus watkinsi
- †Lioestheria – tentative report
- †Liopeplum
  - †Liopeplum cretaceum
  - †Liopeplum eiodermum
  - †Liopeplum leioderma
  - †Liopeplum leioderma breve
  - †Liopeplum leioderma longum
  - †Liopeplum leioderma tabulatum
  - †Liopeplum rugosum
- †Liopistha
  - †Liopistha alternata
  - †Liopistha formosa
  - †Liopistha protexta
- †Liothyris
  - †Liothyris carolinensis – or unidentified comparable form
  - †Liothyris navarroana
- Liquidambar – tentative report
- †Lirosoma
  - †Lirosoma cretacea
- †Lispodesthes
  - †Lispodesthes lirata
  - †Lispodesthes panda
  - †Lispodesthes patula
- †Lissodus
  - †Lissodus babulski – or unidentified related form
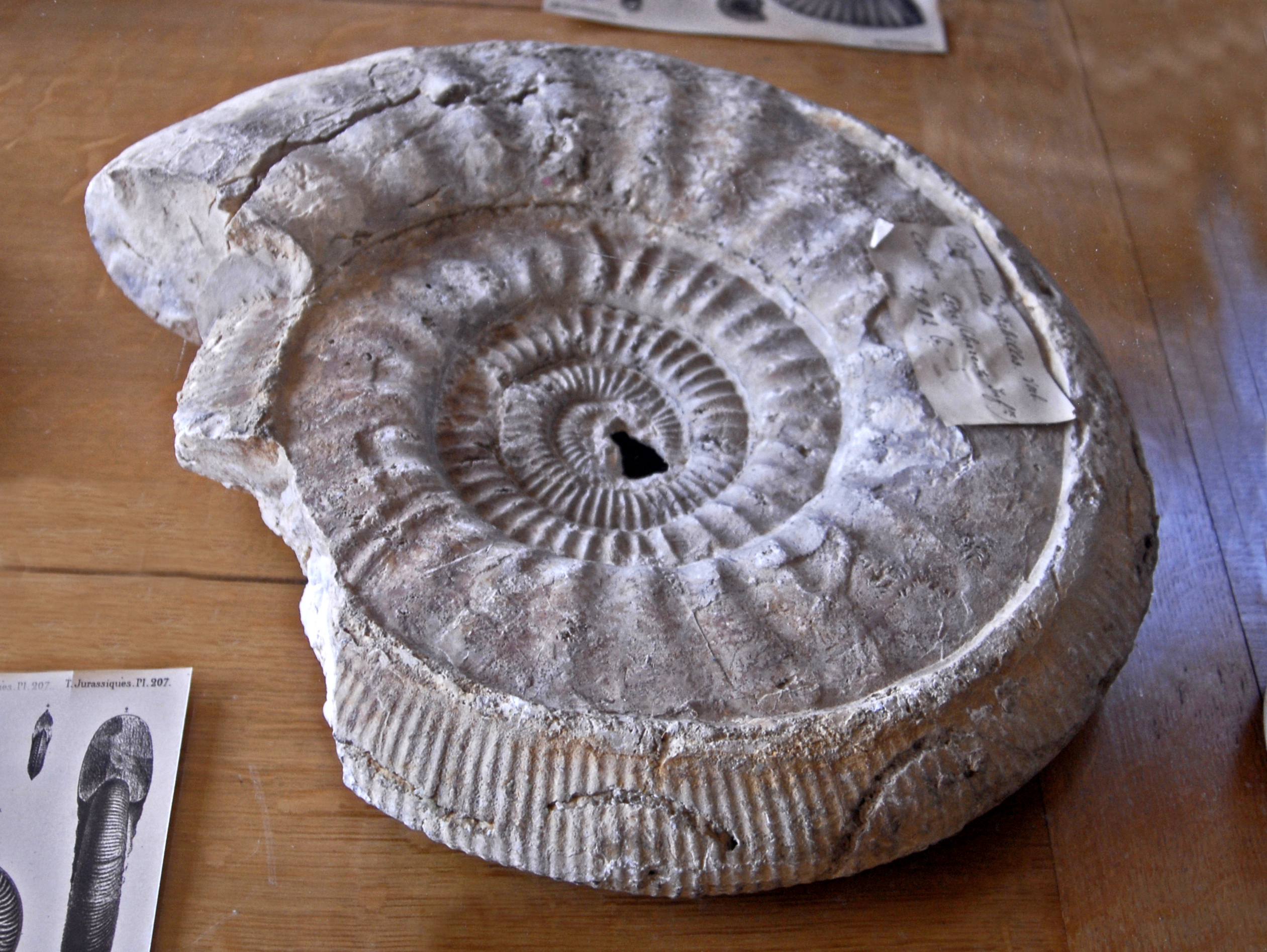
- Lithacoceras
  †Lithacoceras
  - †Lithacoceras malonianum
- Lithophaga
- †Lomirosa
  - †Lomirosa cretacea
- †Lonchidion
  - †Lonchidion anitae – type locality for species
  - †Lonchidion humblei – type locality for species
  - †Lonchidion selachos
- †Longoconcha
  - †Longoconcha dalli
  - †Longoconcha navarroensis
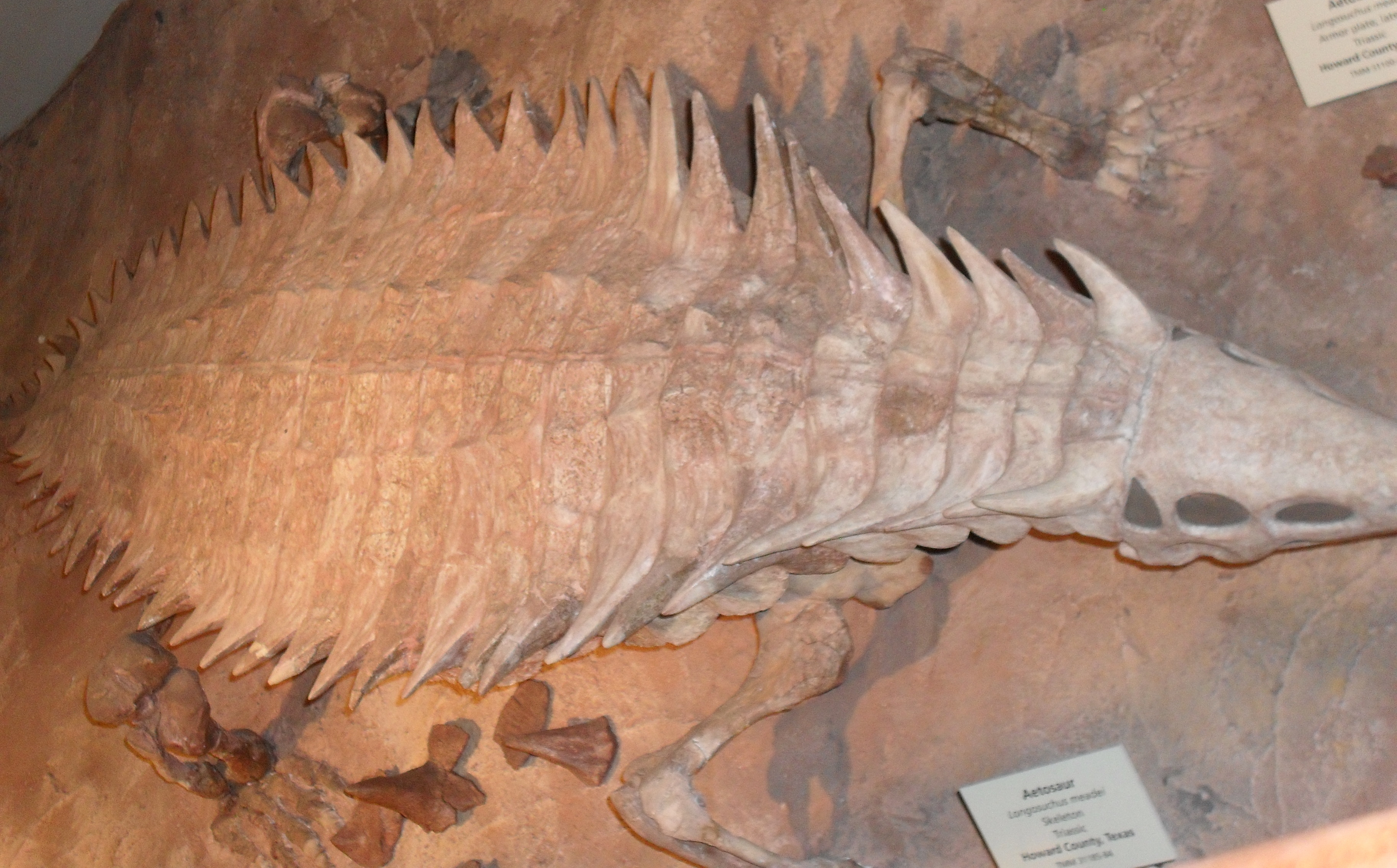
- Mounted fossilized skeleton of the Late Triassic aetosaur Longosuchus
  †Longosuchus
  - †Longosuchus meadei – type locality for species
  - †Longosuchus meadi
- Lopha
  - †Lopha falcata
  - †Lopha mesenterica
  - †Lopha subovata
- †Loriolia
  - †Loriolia rosana
- †Lowenstamia
  - †Lowenstamia subplanus – or unidentified comparable form
- †Loxostomoides
  - †Loxostomoides cushmani
- †Lucasuchus – type locality for genus
  - †Lucasuchus hunti – type locality for species
- Lucina
  - †Lucina aspera
  - †Lucina chatfieldana
  - †Lucina dentonana
  - †Lucina glebula
  - †Lucina oleodorsum
  - †Lucina potosina
  - †Lucina seminolis
- †Luisogalathea
  - †Luisogalathea cretacea
- †Lupira
  - †Lupira pyriformis
- †Lutema
  - †Lutema geniculata
  - †Lutema hubbardi
  - †Lutema munda
  - †Lutema simpsonensis
- †Lycettia
  - †Lycettia tippana
  - †Lycettia tippanus
- †Lyriochlamys – tentative report

== M ==
- †Macraster
  - †Macraster arguilera
  - †Macraster elegans
  - †Macraster nodopyda
- †Macrepistius
- †Macrocerithium
  - †Macrocerithium tramitense
- †Macromesodon
  - †Macromesodon dumblei
- †Magadiceramus
  - †Magadiceramus complicatus
  - †Magadiceramus crenelatus
  - †Magadiceramus crenistriatus – or unidentified comparable form
  - †Magadiceramus subquadratus
- †Magnoavipes – type locality for genus
  - †Magnoavipes lowei – type locality for species
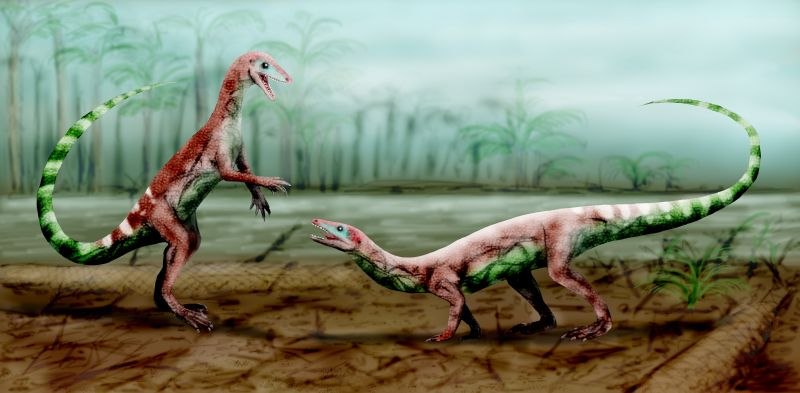
- Life restoration of the Late Triassic reptile Malerisaurus
  †Malerisaurus
- Malletia
  - †Malletia littlei
  - †Malletia longfrons
  - †Malletia longifrons
  - †Malletia stephensoni
- †Mammites
  - †Mammites powelli – type locality for species
- †Mantelliceras
  - †Mantelliceras cantianum
  - †Mantelliceras martimpreyi – or unidentified comparable form
  - †Mantelliceras saxbii
- †Margaritella
  - †Margaritella pumila
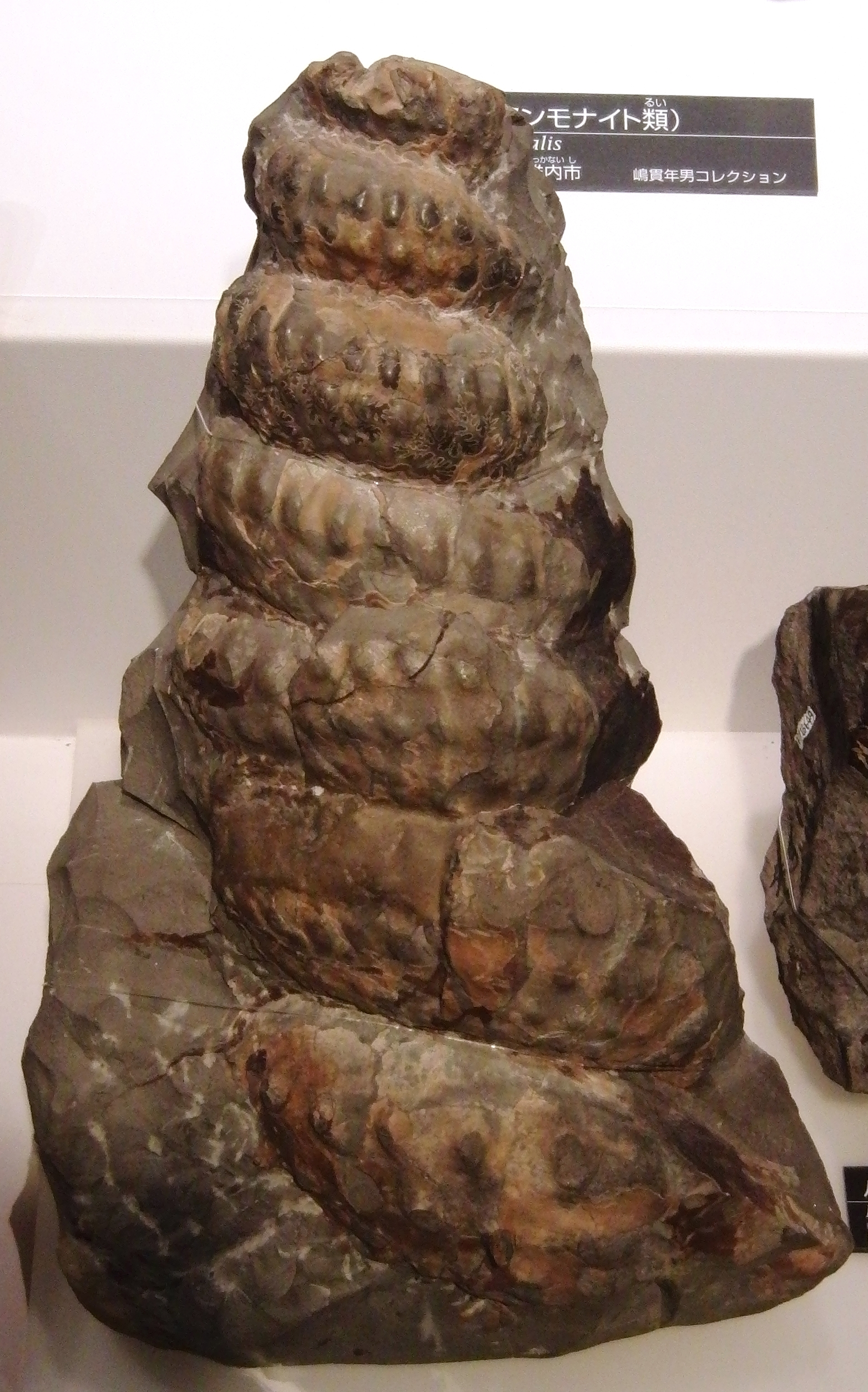
- Fossilized shell of the Early-Late Cretaceous ammonoid cephalopod Mariella
  †Mariella
  - †Mariella bosquensis
  - †Mariella brazoensis
  - †Mariella camachoensis
  - †Mariella cenomanensis – or unidentified comparable form
  - †Mariella davisense
  - †Mariella rhacioformis
  - †Mariella wysogorskii
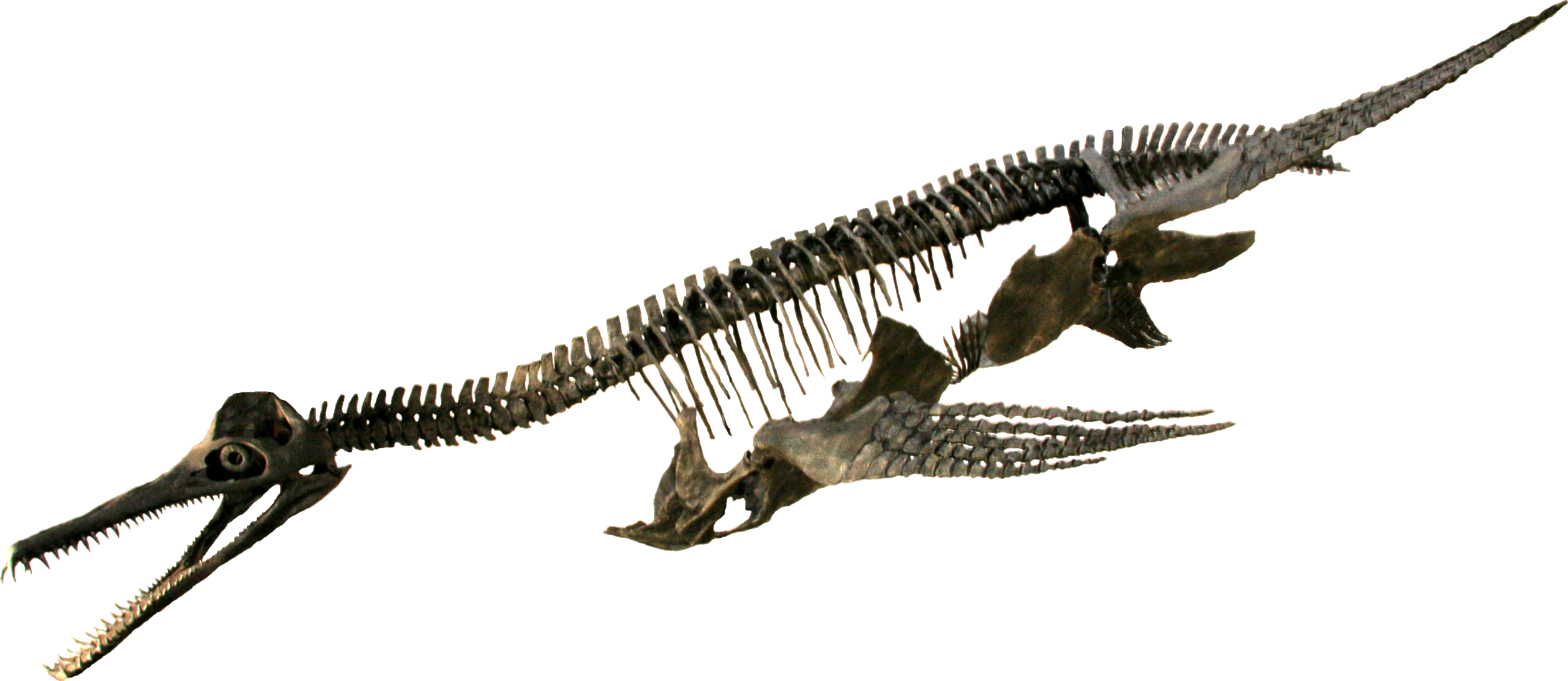
- Mounted skeleton of the Late Cretaceous plesiosaur Martinectes
  †Martinectes
  - †Martinectes bonneri
- †Mataxa
  - †Mataxa subteres
  - †Mataxa valida
  - †Mataxa valida multilirae
- †Mathilda
  - †Mathilda cedarensis
  - †Mathilda corona
- †Meandraraea
  - †Meandraraea plummeri – type locality for species
  - †Meandraraea tulae – or unidentified comparable form
- †Medionapus
  - †Medionapus elongatus
- Megalomphalus – or unidentified comparable form
- †Megalosauropus – tentative report
  - †Megalosauropus titanopelobatidus – type locality for species
- Melanatria
  - †Melanatria venusta
- †Melicertites
- Membranipora
- Membraniporidra
- †Menabites
  - †Menabites austinensis
  - †Menabites danei
  - †Menabites delawarensis
  - †Menabites vanuxemi
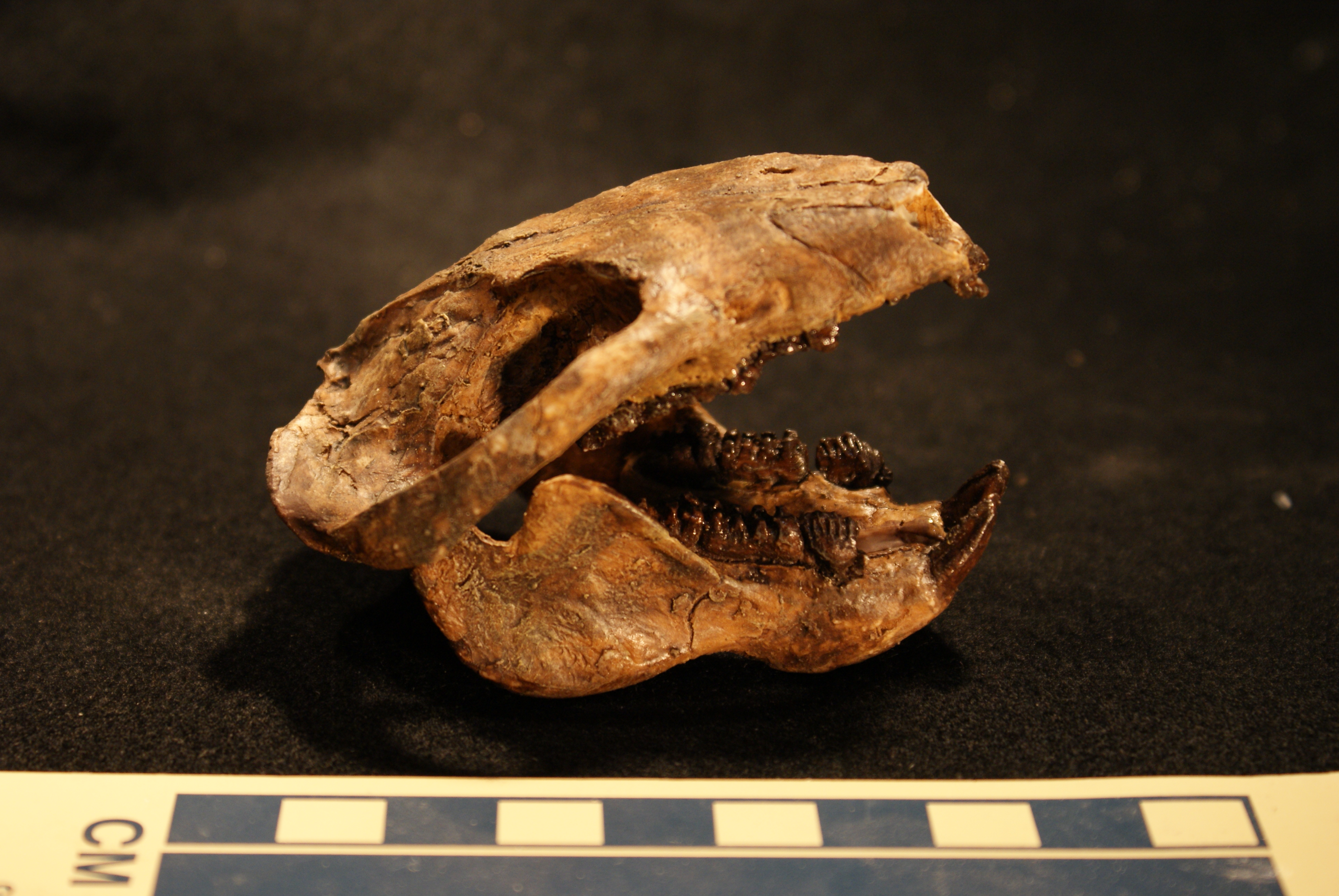
- Fossilized skull of the Late Cretaceous multituberculate mammal Meniscoessus
  †Meniscoessus
- †Menuites
- Mesalia
  - †Mesalia shumardi
- †Mesodma
- †Mesomorpha
  - †Mesomorpha excavata
  - †Mesomorpha vaughani – type locality for species
- †Metengonoceras
  - †Metengonoceras acutum
  - †Metengonoceras ambiguum
  - †Metengonoceras bravoense
  - †Metengonoceras dumbli
  - †Metengonoceras inscriptum
- †Metoicoceras
  - †Metoicoceras crassicostae
  - †Metoicoceras geslinianum
  - †Metoicoceras latoventer
  - †Metoicoceras swallovi
  - †Metoicoceras swallovii
  - †Metoicoceras swallovii macrum
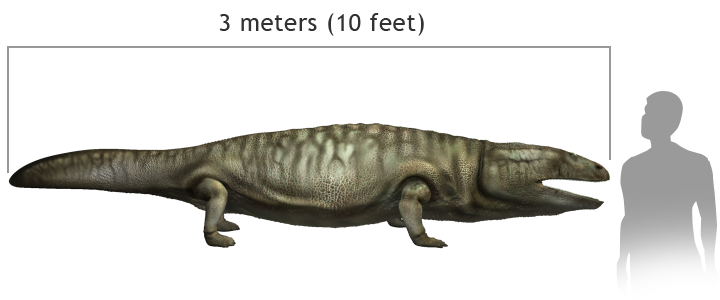
- Life restoration of the Late Triassic amphibian Metoposaurus with an anachronistic human to scale
  †Metoposaurus
  - †Metoposaurus bakeri – type locality for species
  - †Metoposaurus fraasi
  - †Metoposaurus jonesi – type locality for species
  - †Metoposaurus perfecta
- †Mexicaprina
  - †Mexicaprina cornuta
- †Micrabacia
  - †Micrabacia marylandica
  - †Micrabacia radiata – type locality for species
- †Micraster
  - †Micraster americanus
  - †Micraster uddeni – type locality for species
- †Microsolena
  - †Microsolena texana – type locality for species
- †Microsulcatoceras
  - †Microsulcatoceras texanum – type locality for species
- †Miocardiopsis
  - †Miocardiopsis hendersoni
  - †Miocardiopsis shumardi
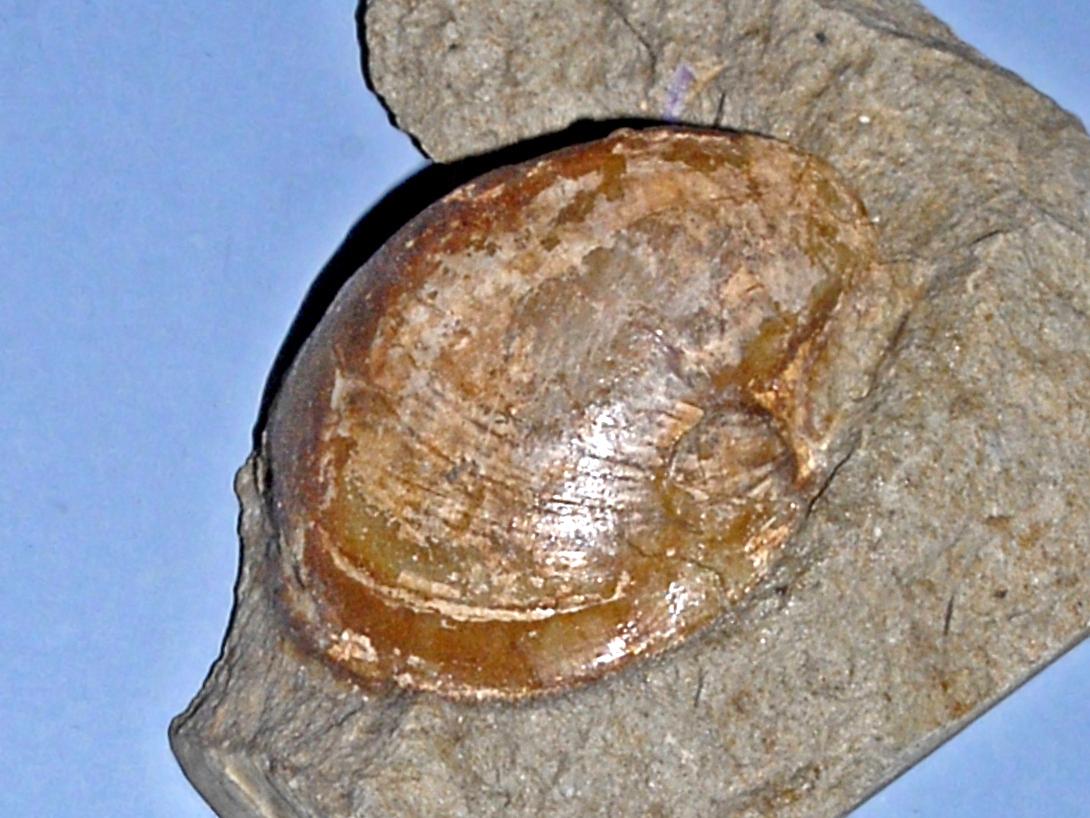
- Fossilized shell of the Devonian-modern marine bivalve Modiolus, or horsemussel
  †Modiolus
  - †Modiolus sedesclaris
  - †Modiolus sedesclarus
  - †Modiolus sedisclarus
- Monodonta – tentative report
  - †Monodonta cancellosa
- †Monopleura – tentative report
- †Monroea
  - †Monroea castellana
- Montastraea
  - †Montastraea comalensis
  - †Montastraea edwardsensis – type locality for species
  - †Montastraea pecosensis – type locality for species
  - †Montastraea roemeriana – type locality for species
  - †Montastraea texana
  - †Montastraea travisensis
  - †Montastraea whitneyi
- †Morea
  - †Morea cancellaria
  - †Morea cancellaria corsicanensis
  - †Morea cancellaria crassa
  - †Morea marylandica
  - †Morea marylandica bella
  - †Morea marylandica languida
  - †Morea transenna
- †Moremanoceras
  - †Moremanoceras elgini
  - †Moremanoceras flexuosum – type locality for species
- †Morphastrea
  - †Morphastrea barcenai – or unidentified comparable form
- †Mortoniceras
  - †Mortoniceras austinensis
  - †Mortoniceras drakei
  - †Mortoniceras maxima
  - †Mortoniceras minima
  - †Mortoniceras perinflatum
  - †Mortoniceras rostratum
  - †Mortoniceras wintoni
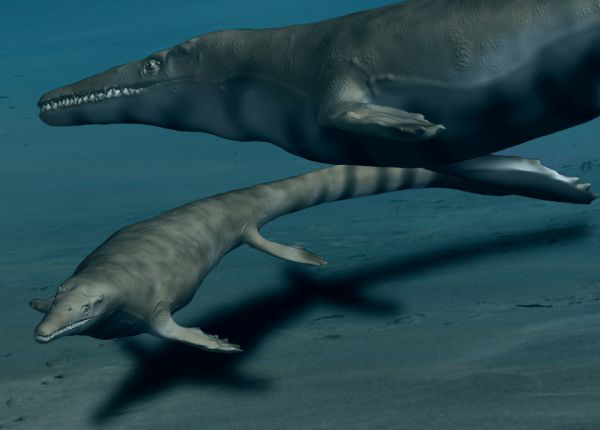
- Life restoration of two of the Late Cretaceous Mosasaurus
  †Mosasaurus
  - †Mosasaurus maximus
  - †Mosasaurus missouriensis – tentative report
- †Muensterella
  - †Muensterella jillae – type locality for species
- †Myobarbum
  - †Myobarbum laevigatum
- †Myriophyllia – tentative report
  - †Myriophyllia dumblei – type locality for species
- Myrtea
  - †Myrtea stephensoni
- †Mytiloides
  - †Mytiloides columbianus
- †Mytilus

== N ==
- †Naomichelys
- †Napulus
  - †Napulus octoliratus
  - †Napulus tuberculatus
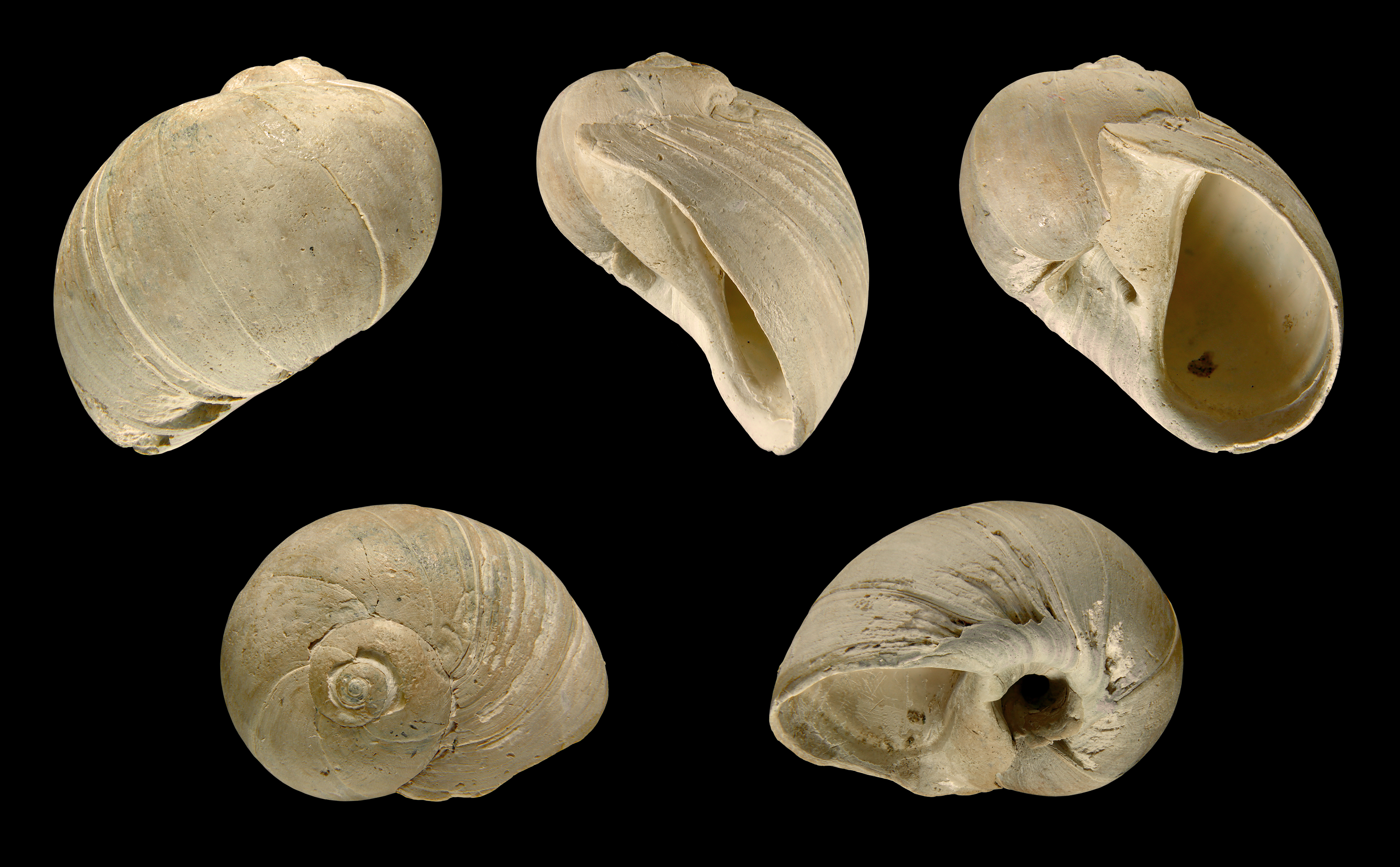
- Multiple views of a fossilized shell belonging to a Natica moon snail
  Natica
  - †Natica dorothiensis
  - †Natica humilis
  - †Natica rivulana
  - †Natica striaticostata
- Nebrius
- †Neithea
  - †Neithea bexarensis
  - †Neithea quinquecostata
- †Nelltia
  - †Nelltia stenzeli
- †Nemocardium
  - †Nemocardium fragile
  - †Nemocardium guadalupense
  - †Nemocardium marcosensis
  - †Nemocardium tenue
- †Nemodon
  - †Nemodon adkinsi
  - †Nemodon bowiei
  - †Nemodon eufalensis
  - †Nemodon eufaulensis
  - †Nemodon eufaulensis lineatus
  - †Nemodon grandis
  - †Nemodon grandis navarroanus
  - †Nemodon martindalensis
  - †Nemodon navarroanus
  - †Nemodon punctus
- †Neobrites
  - †Neobrites nodocostatus
- †Neocardioceras
  - †Neocardioceras juddii
- †Neodeshayesites
  - †Neodeshayesites comalensis
  - †Neodeshayesites mayfieldensis
- †Neogauthiericeras
  - †Neogauthiericeras zafimahovai
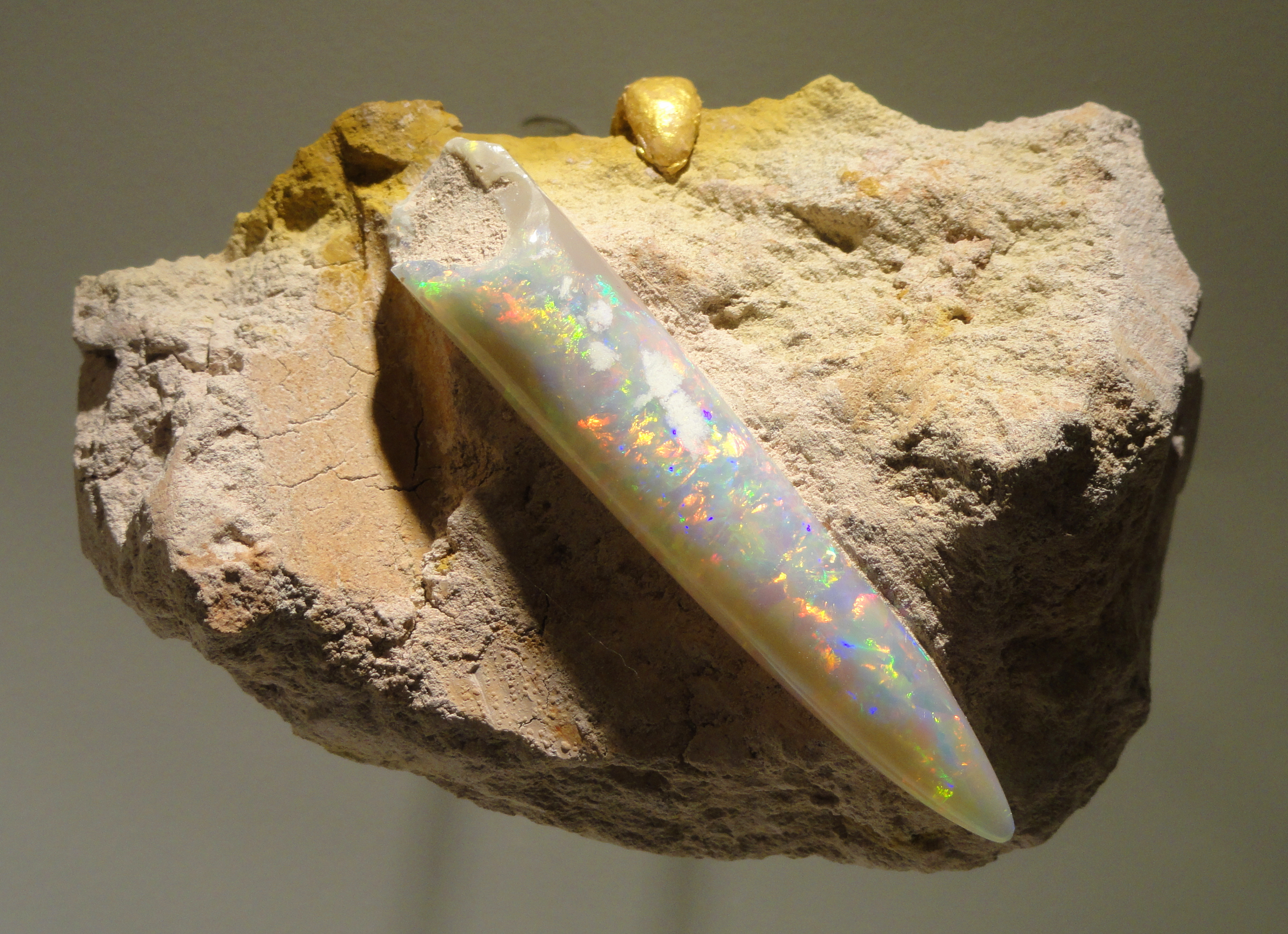
- Opalized guard of the belemnoid cephalopod Neohibolites
  †Neohibolites
- †Neophlycticeras
  - †Neophlycticeras archerae – type locality for species
  - †Neophlycticeras blancheti – or unidentified comparable form
  - †Neophlycticeras fascicostatum – type locality for species
  - †Neophlycticeras roemeri
  - †Neophlycticeras texanum
- †Neoptychites
- †Nerinea – tentative report
- Nerita
  - †Nerita ornata
  - †Nerita semilevis
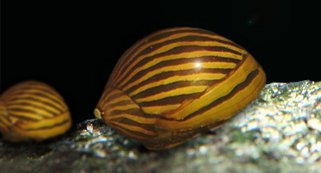
- Living Neritina or nerite snails
  Neritina
  - †Neritina ambrosana
  - †Neritina insolita
- Nodosaria
  - †Nodosaria barkeri
- †Nonactaeonina
  - †Nonactaeonina deflexa
  - †Nonactaeonina graphoides
  - †Nonactaeonina tensa
  - †Nonactaeonina triticea
- †Nonaphalagodus – type locality for genus
  - †Nonaphalagodus trinitiensis – type locality for species
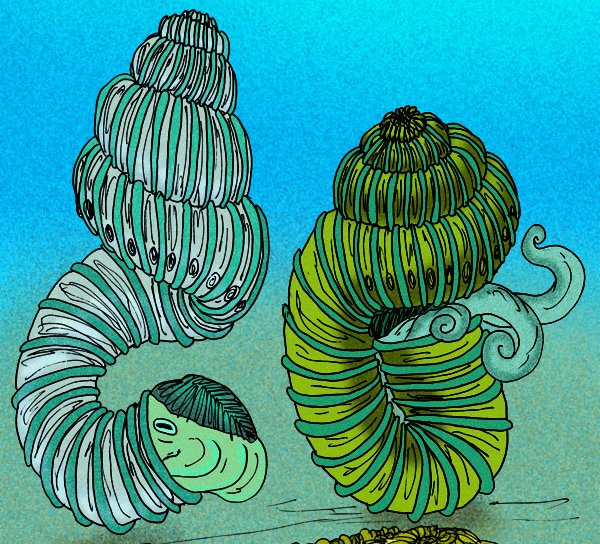
- Restoration of several species of the Late Cretaceous ammonoid cephalopod Nostoceras
  †Nostoceras
  - †Nostoceras approximans
  - †Nostoceras colubriformis
  - †Nostoceras draconsis
  - †Nostoceras helicinum crassum
  - †Nostoceras helicinum humile
  - †Nostoceras helicinus
  - †Nostoceras hyatti
  - †Nostoceras splendidum
  - †Nostoceras stantoni aberrans
  - †Nostoceras stantoni prematurum
- †Notodonax
- †Notopoides – tentative report
  - †Notopoides pflugervillensis – type locality for species
- †Nucleopygus
  - †Nucleopygus texanus
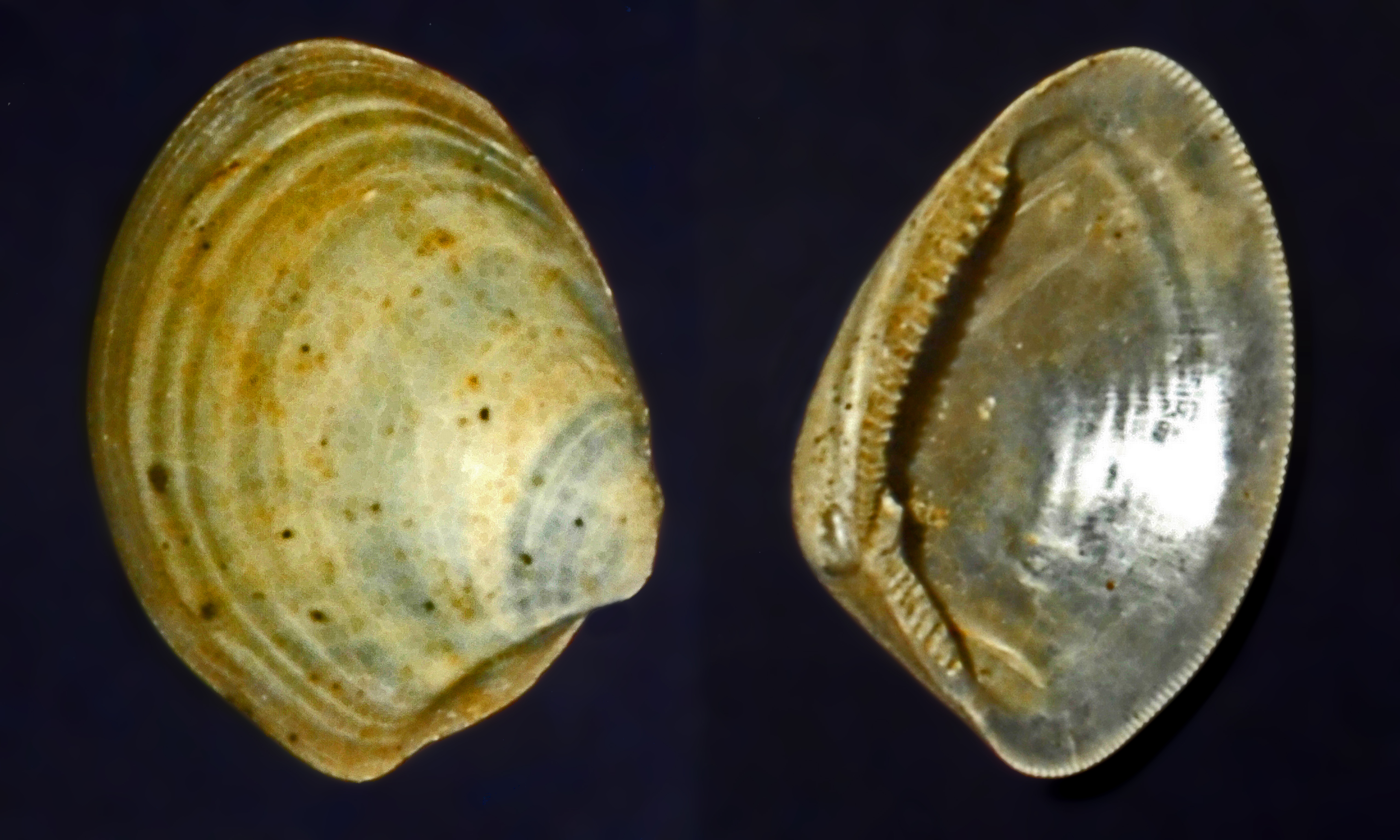
- Interior of a fossilized shell of the Early Ordovician-modern marine bivalve Nucula
  Nucula
  - †Nucula camia
  - †Nucula chatfieldensis
  - †Nucula chatsfieldensis
  - †Nucula ciboloensis
  - †Nucula cuneifrons
  - †Nucula microstriata
  - †Nucula nacatochana
  - †Nucula percrassa
  - †Nucula perequalis
  - †Nucula rivulana
  - †Nucula stantoni
  - †Nucula waltonensis
- Nuculana
  - †Nuculana coloradoensis
  - †Nuculana corbetensis
  - †Nuculana corsicana
  - †Nuculana houstoni
  - †Nuculana mutuata
  - †Nuculana protexta
  - †Nuculana rostratruncata
  - †Nuculana travisana
  - †Nuculana whitfieldi
- †Nudivagus – tentative report
- †Nymphalucina
  - †Nymphalucina linearia
  - †Nymphalucina parva
- †Nyssa

== O ==
- †Odaxosaurus
  - †Odaxosaurus piger
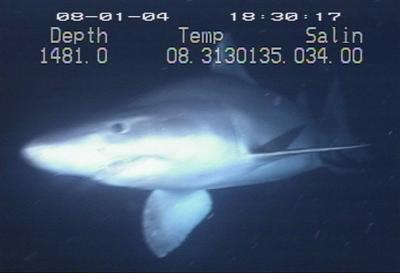
- A living Odontaspis sand shark
  Odontaspis
  - †Odontaspis aculeatus
- †Ogilviastraea – tentative report
  - †Ogilviastraea richardsi – type locality for species
- †Oklatheridium
  - †Oklatheridium minax
  - †Oklatheridium szalayi
- †Oligoptycha
  - †Oligoptycha americana – tentative report
- †Onchopristis
  - †Onchopristis dunklei
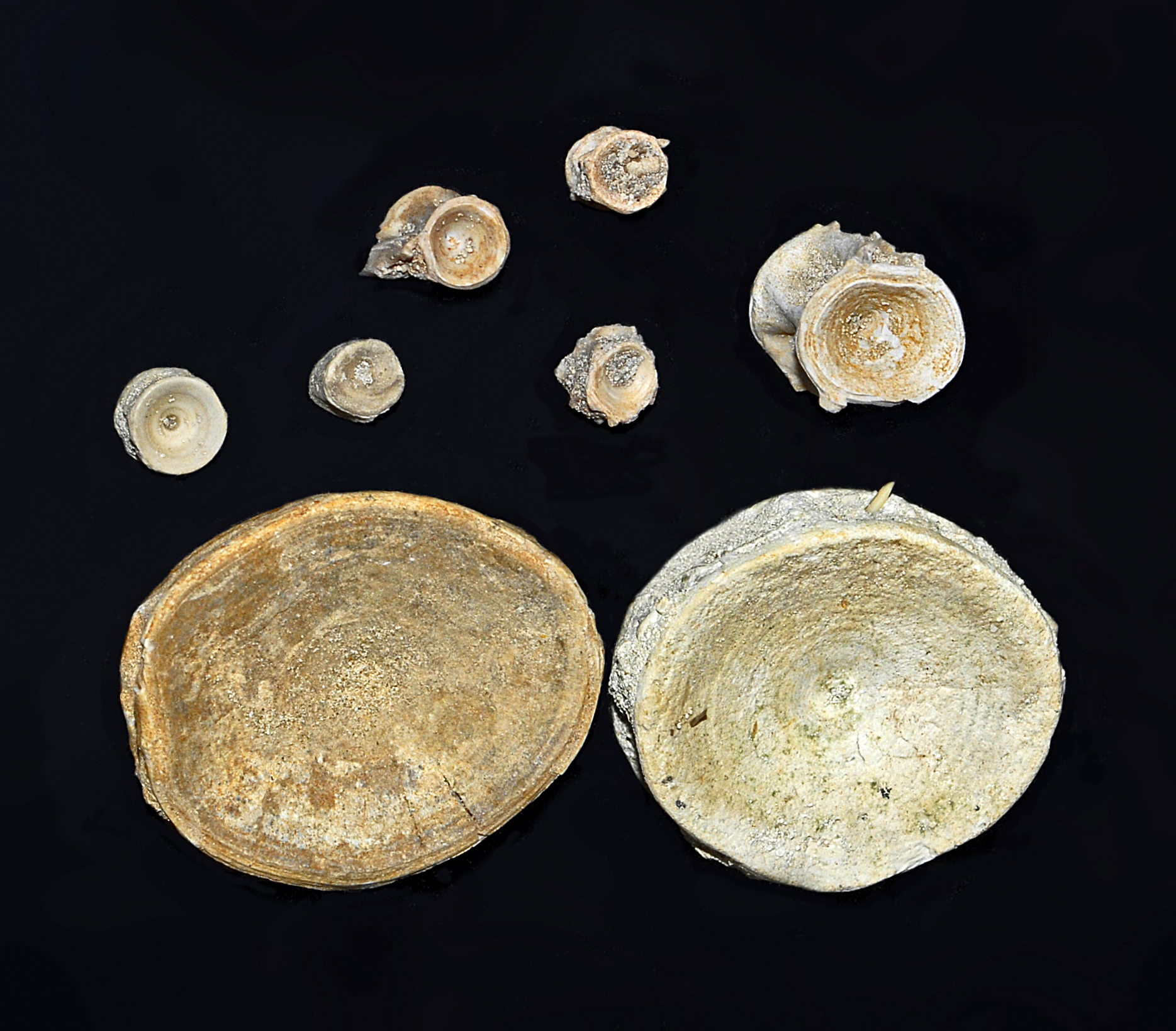
- Fossilized vertebrae of the Cretaceous sawfish Onchosaurus
  †Onchosaurus
- †Opertochasma
  - †Opertochasma scaphoides
  - †Opertochasma subconicum
  - †Opertochasma venustum
- †Ophiomorpha
- †Ophiopsis – tentative report
- Ophiura
  - †Ophiura graysonensis
  - †Ophiura texana
  - †Ophiura travisana – type locality for species
- †Opis
  - †Opis elevata – tentative report
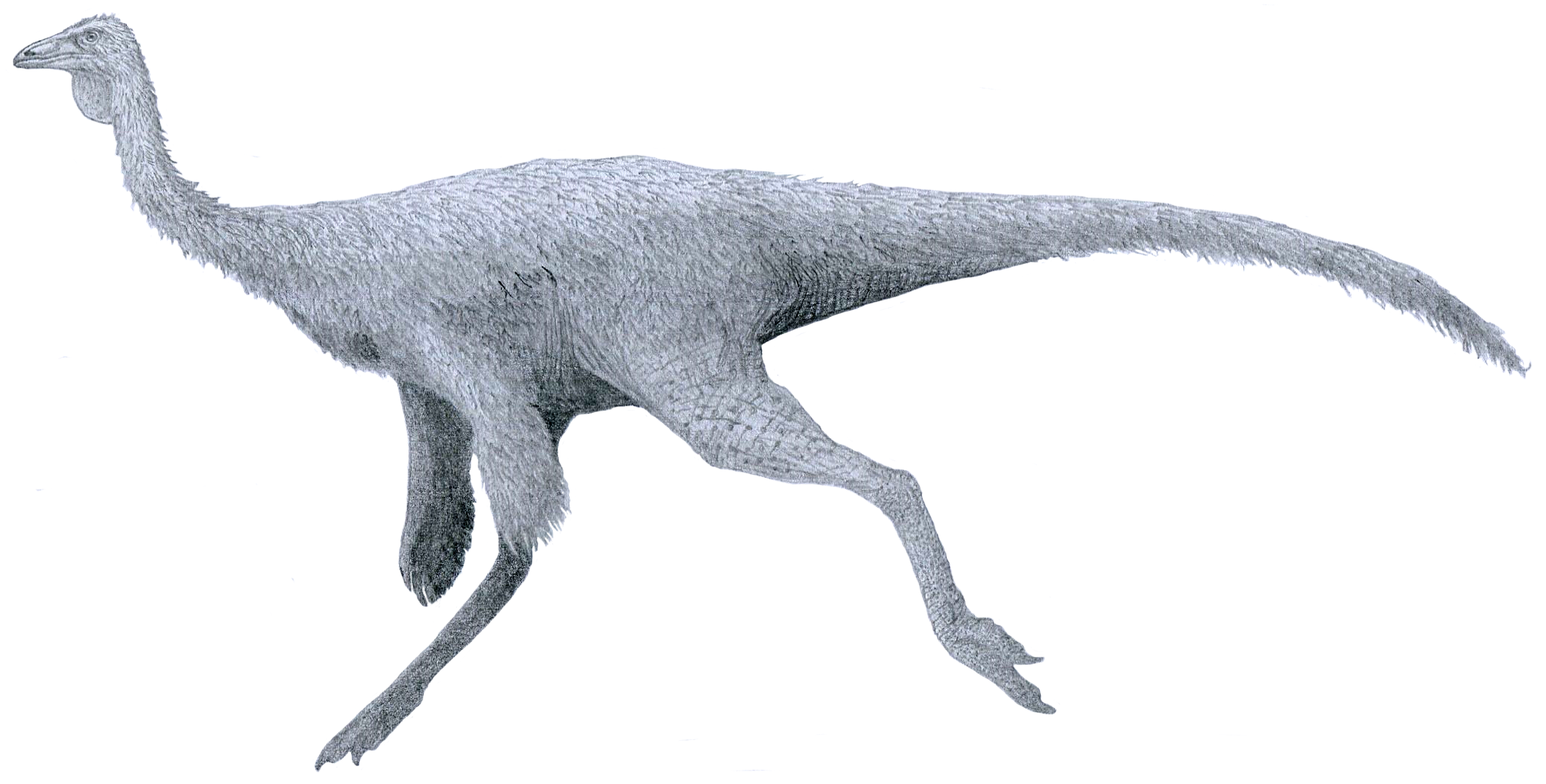
- Life restoration of the Late Cretaceous ostrich dinosaur Ornithomimus
  †Ornithomimus
- †Ornopsis
  - †Ornopsis digressa
  - †Ornopsis maxeyi
  - †Ornopsis pulchra
  - †Ornopsis solistella
- †Ostlingoceras
  - †Ostlingoceras brandi
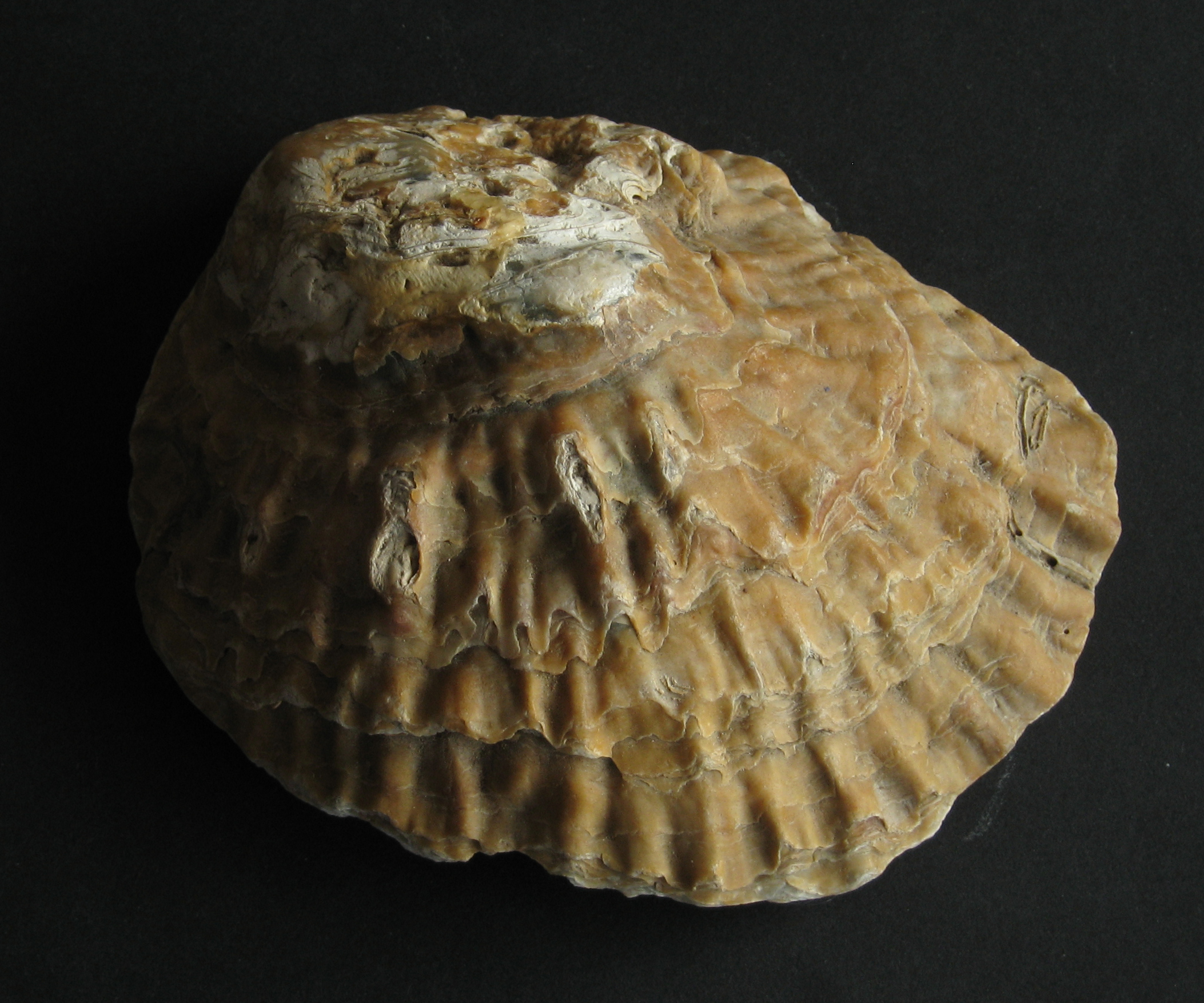
- Shell of an Ostrea, or oyster
  Ostrea
  - †Ostrea alternans
  - †Ostrea bella
  - †Ostrea beloiti
  - †Ostrea carica
  - †Ostrea carinata – or unidentified related form
  - †Ostrea crenulimargo
  - †Ostrea leveretti
  - †Ostrea lugubris
  - †Ostrea owenana
  - †Ostrea panda
  - †Ostrea rubradiata
  - †Ostrea soleniscus
  - †Ostrea subovata
  - †Ostrea subradiata
- †Otischalkia – type locality for genus
  - †Otischalkia elderae – type locality for species
- †Ovalastrea – type locality for genus
  - †Ovalastrea fredericksburgensis – type locality for species
  - †Ovalastrea pecosensis – type locality for species
- †Oxyrhina
  - †Oxyrhina extenta
- †Oxytropidoceras
  - †Oxytropidoceras acuticarinatum
  - †Oxytropidoceras acutocarinatum
  - †Oxytropidoceras bravoensis
  - †Oxytropidoceras carbonarium
  - †Oxytropidoceras diazi
  - †Oxytropidoceras moorei
  - †Oxytropidoceras multifidum
  - †Oxytropidoceras pandalense – or unidentified comparable form
  - †Oxytropidoceras powelli
  - †Oxytropidoceras salasi
  - †Oxytropidoceras stenzeli
  - †Oxytropidoceras supani
  - †Oxytropidoceras texanum
  - †Oxytropidoceras uddeni

== P ==
- †Pachycheilosuchus – type locality for genus
  - †Pachycheilosuchus trinquei – type locality for species
- †Pachydesmoceras
- †Pachydiscus
  - †Pachydiscus arkansanus
  - †Pachydiscus paulsoni
  - †Pachydiscus scotti
  - †Pachydiscus travisi
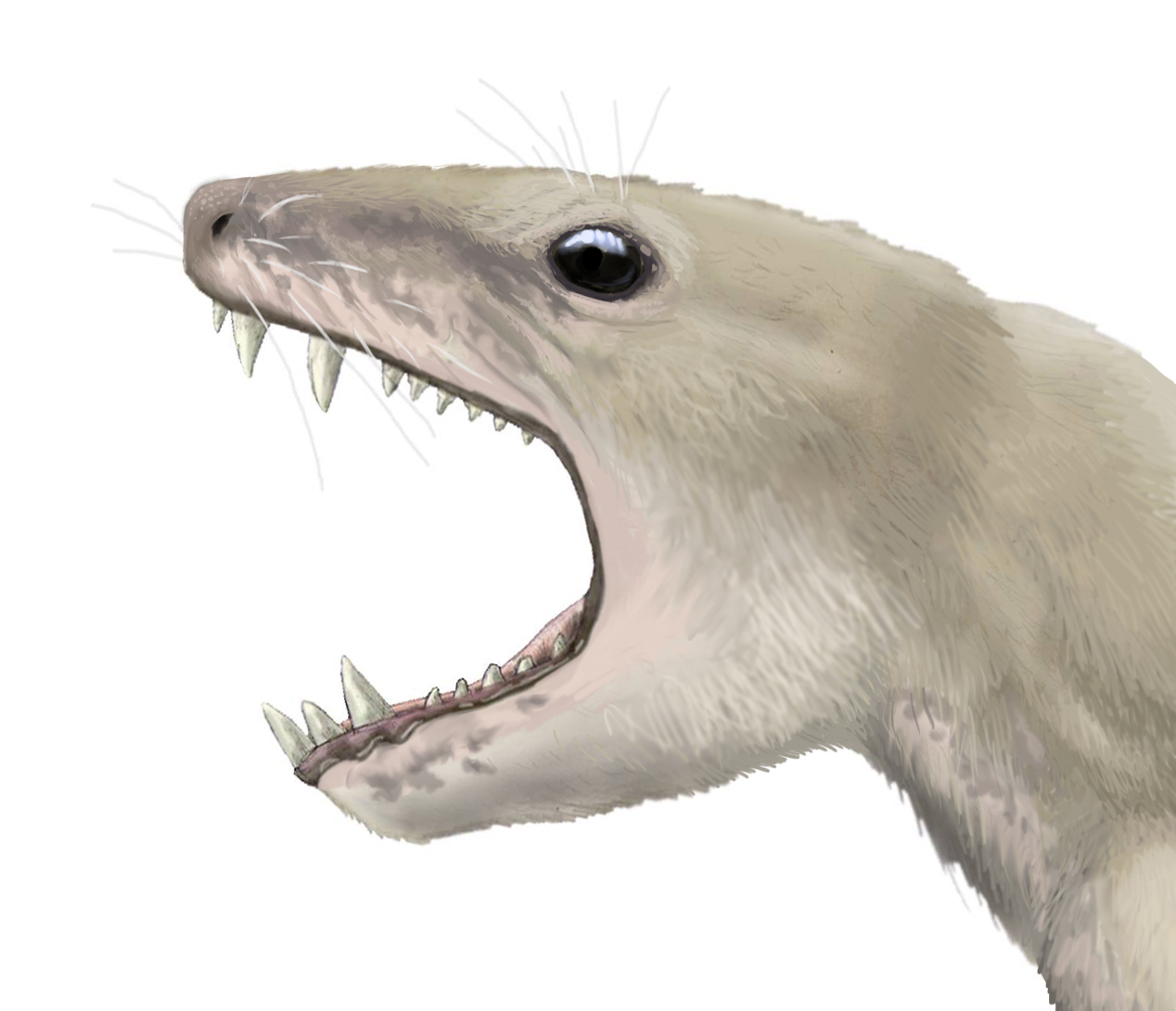
- Restorative portrait of the Early Jurassic synapsid (mammal precursor) Pachygenelus
  †Pachygenelus
  - †Pachygenelus milleri – type locality for species
- †Pachymelania
- †Pachymya
- Pagurus
  - †Pagurus travisensis
- †Paladmete
  - †Paladmete alta
  - †Paladmete cancellaria
  - †Paladmete cancelleria
  - †Paladmete corbuliformis
  - †Paladmete elegans
  - †Paladmete gardnerae
  - †Paladmete inequalis
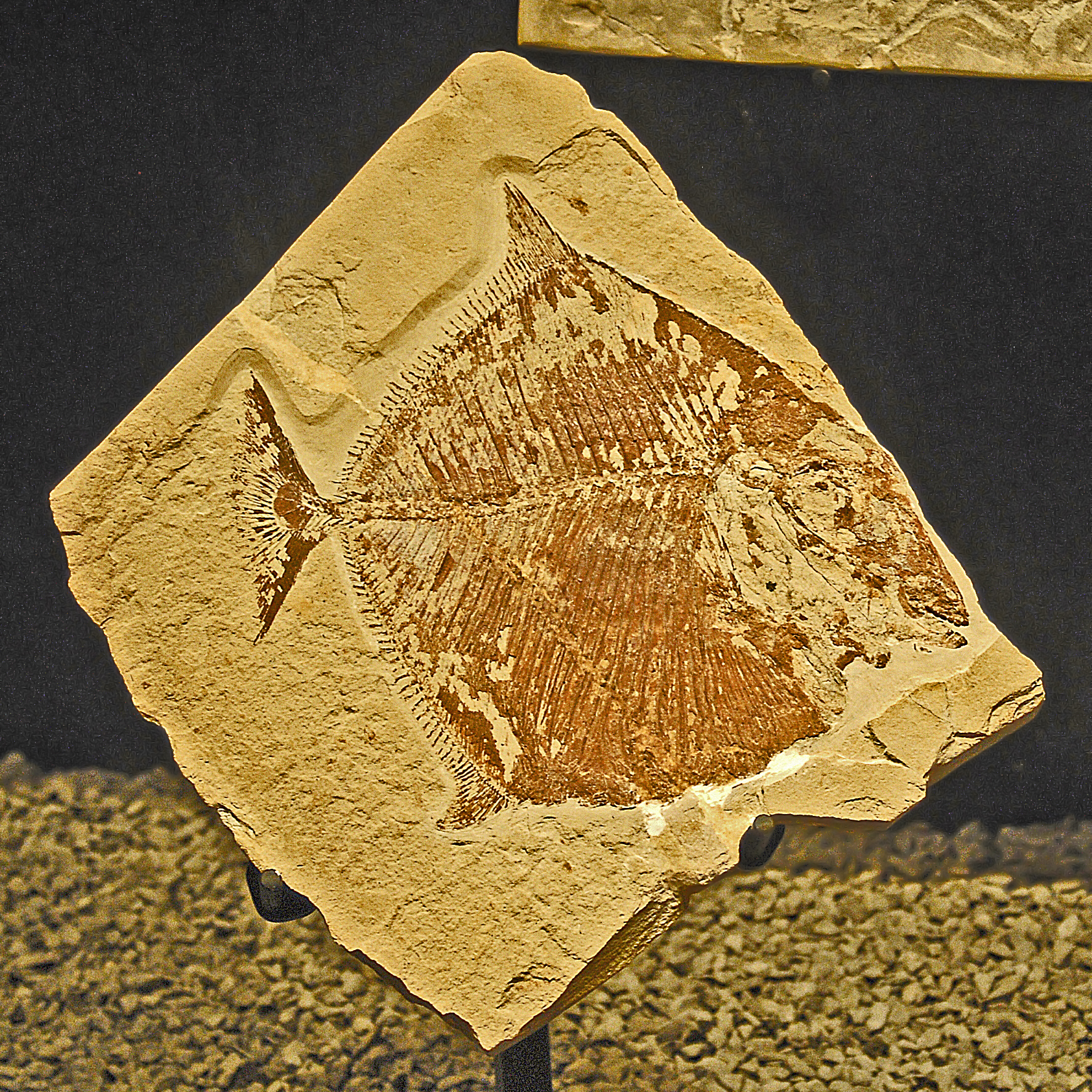
- Fossilized skeleton of the Early Cretaceous-Eocene bony fish Palaeobalistum
  †Palaeobalistum
  - †Palaeobalistum geiseri – type locality for species
  - †Palaeobalistum rectidens – type locality for species
- †Palaeoctonus
  - †Palaeoctonus dumblianus – type locality for species
  - †Palaeoctonus orthodon – type locality for species
- †Palaeocypraea
  - †Palaeocypraea corsicanana
  - †Palaeocypraea nuciformis
- †Palaeogaleus
  - †Palaeogaleus navarroensis – type locality for species
- †Paleollanosaurus – type locality for genus
  - †Paleollanosaurus fraseri – type locality for species
- †Paleomolops
  - †Paleomolops langstoni – type locality for species
- †Paleopsephaea
  - †Paleopsephaea decorosa
  - †Paleopsephaea patens
  - †Paleopsephaea sinuosa
  - †Paleopsephaea vadoana
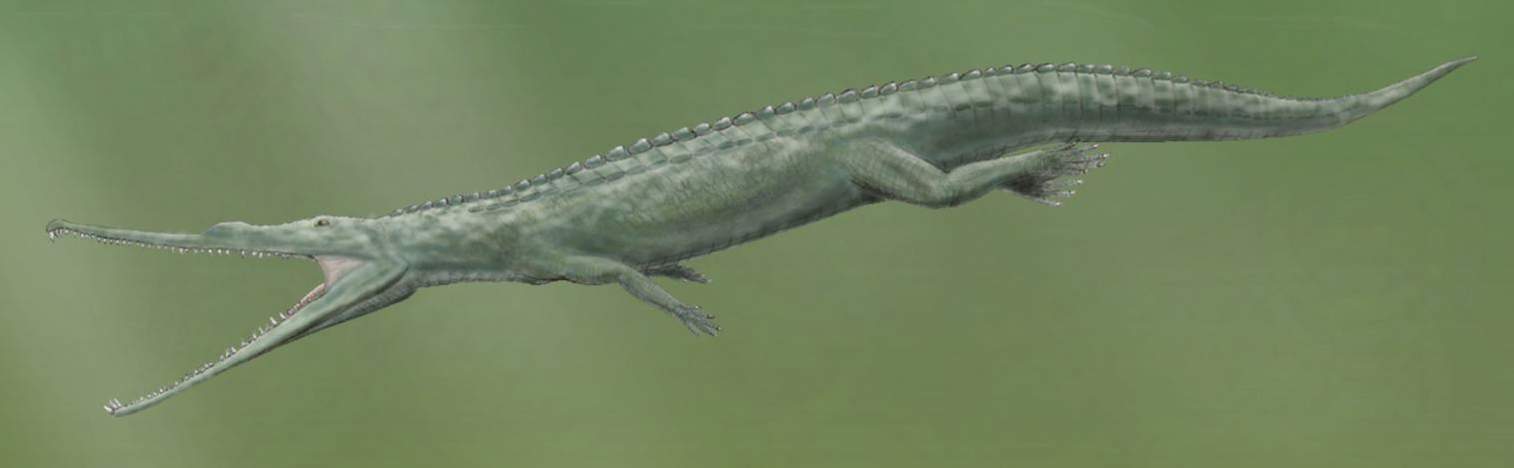
- Life restoration of the Late Triassic phytosaur Paleorhinus
  †Paleorhinus
  - †Paleorhinus sawini – type locality for species
- †Paluxysuchus – type locality for genus
  - †Paluxysuchus newmani – type locality for species
- †Panis
  - †Panis cuneiformis
- Panopea
  - †Panopea anacachoensis – type locality for species
  - †Panopea subplicata
- †Pantojaloria
  - †Pantojaloria sphaerica
- †Pappotherium – type locality for genus
  - †Pappotherium pattersoni – type locality for species
- †Paracimexomys
- Paracyprideis
  - †Paracyprideis graysonensis
- Paracypris
  - †Paracypris alta
- †Parafusus – tentative report
- †Parahoplites
  - †Parahoplites thomasi
  - †Parahoplites wintoni
- †Paraisurus
  - †Paraisurus compressus
- †Paramicrodon – type locality for genus
  - †Paramicrodon estesi – type locality for species
- †Parandiceras
  - †Parandiceras indicum – or unidentified comparable form
- †Paranecrocarcinus
  - †Paranecrocarcinus moseleyi
- †Paranecrocarinus
  - †Paranecrocarinus ovalis
- †Paranomia
  - †Paranomia scabra
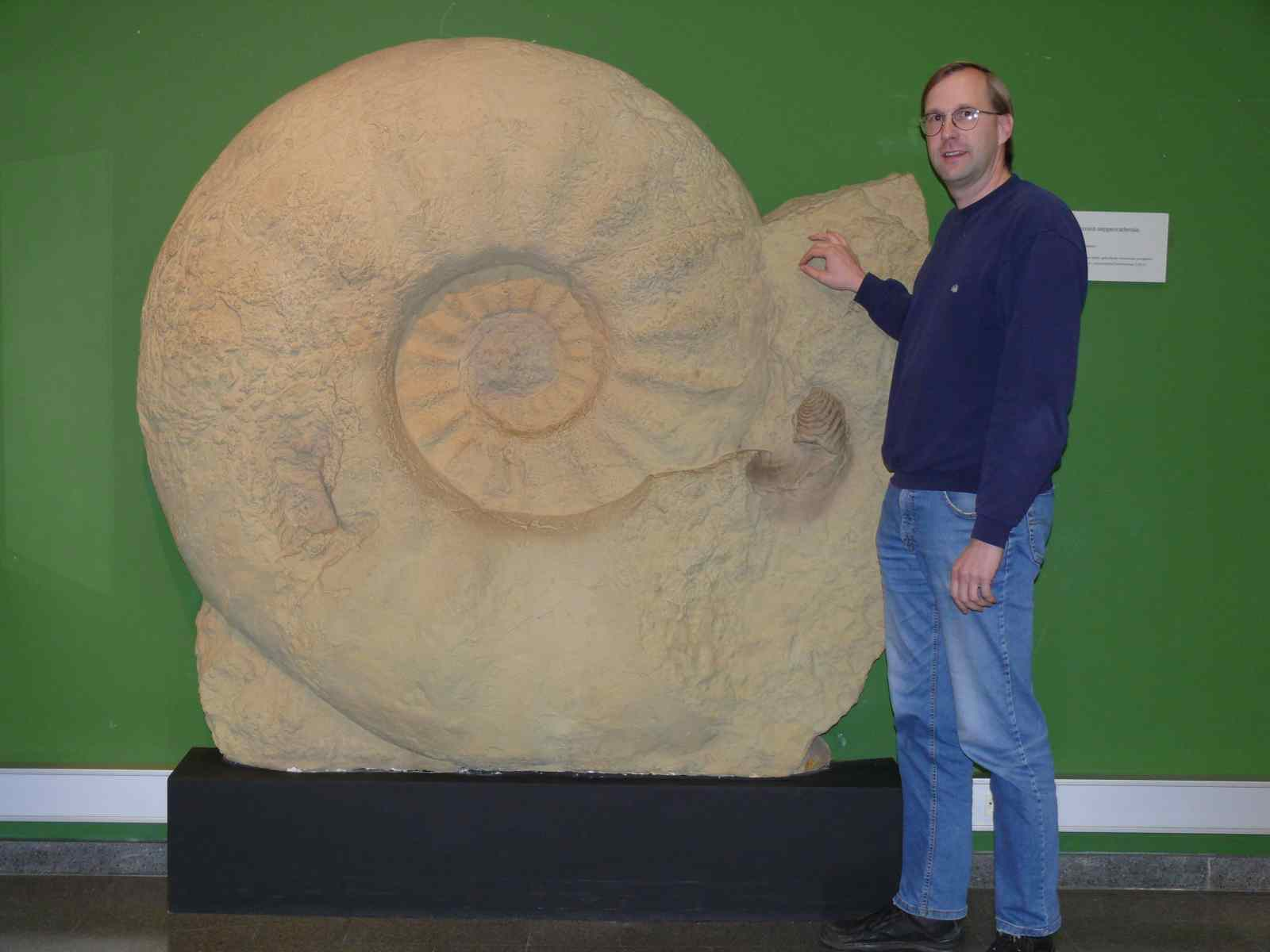
- Fossilized shell of the Late Cretaceous ammonoid cephalopod Parapuzosia with a human indicating its size
  †Parapuzosia
  - †Parapuzosia americana – type locality for species
  - †Parapuzosia bosei – type locality for species
  - †Parapuzosia sealei – type locality for species
- †Parasaniwa – or unidentified comparable form
  - †Parasaniwa wyomingensis
- Parasmilia
  - †Parasmilia austinensis
  - †Parasmilia bullardi – type locality for species
  - †Parasmilia graysonensis – type locality for species
- †Parasuchus
  - †Parasuchus bransoni
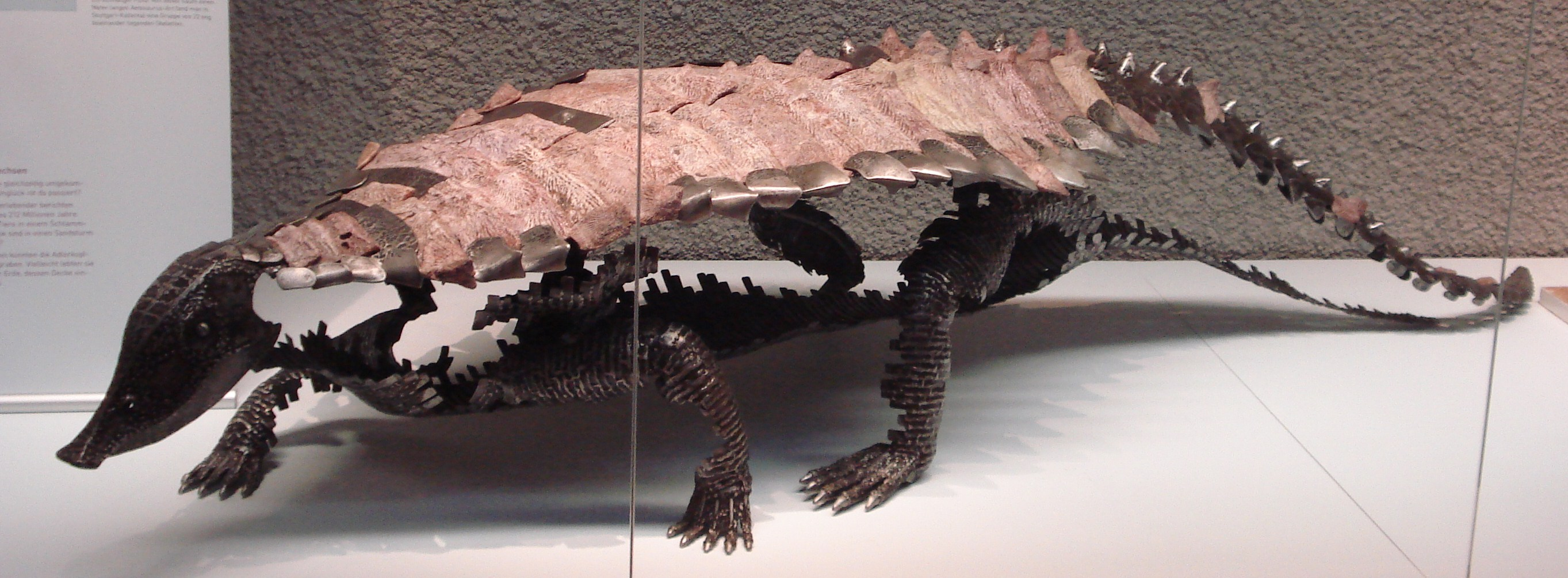
- Mounted fossilized skeleton of the Late Triassic aetosaur Paratypothorax
  †Paratypothorax
- †Paraxiopsis
  - †Paraxiopsis erugatus
- †Parengonoceras
  - †Parengonoceras roemeri
- †Parmicorbula
  - †Parmicorbula corneliana
  - †Parmicorbula hillensis
  - †Parmicorbula numerosa
  - †Parmicorbula rupana
  - †Parmicorbula sinuosa
  - †Parmicorbula suffalciata
  - †Parmicorbula terramaria
  - †Parmicorbula vokesi
- †Paronychodon
  - †Paronychodon lacustris – or unidentified comparable form
- Parvamussium
  - †Parvamussium danei
- †Parvivoluta – tentative report
- Patellina
  - †Patellina subcretacea
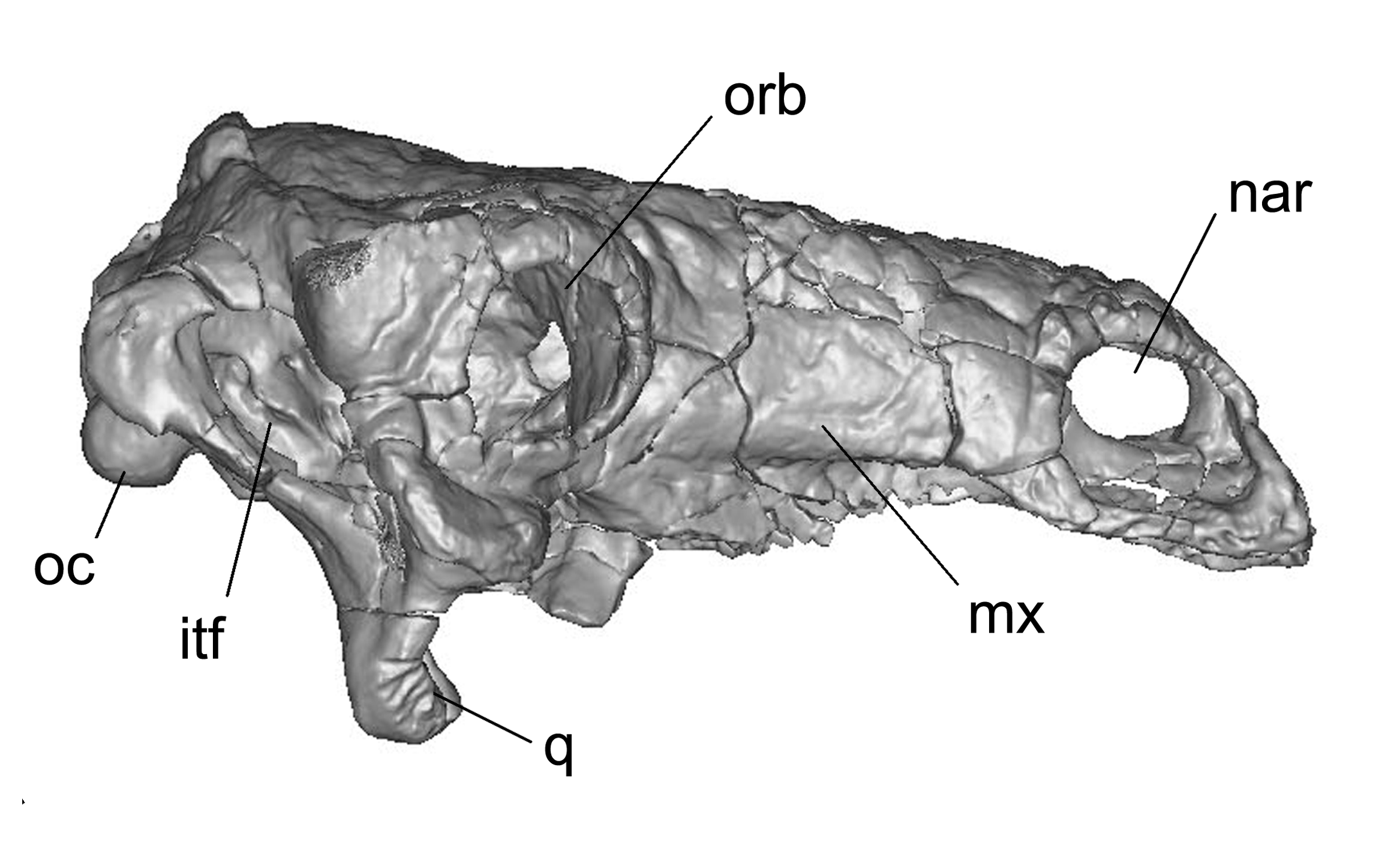
- Fossilized skull in multiple views of the Early Cretaceous armored dinosaur Pawpawsaurus
  †Pawpawsaurus – type locality for genus
  - †Pawpawsaurus campbelli – type locality for species
- †Pecten
  - †Pecten bellula
  - †Pecten bellulus
  - †Pecten catherina
  - †Pecten georgetownensis
  - †Pecten moodyi
  - †Pecten subalpinus
  - †Pecten texanus
  - †Pecten venustus
  - †Pecten wrighti
- †Pedinopsis
  - †Pedinopsis pondi
- †Peilinia
  - †Peilinia quadriplicata
- †Pekinosaurus – or unidentified related form
  - †Pekinosaurus olseni
- †Peneteius
- Periploma
  - †Periploma edwardsi
- †Periplomya
  - †Periplomya sulcatina
- Perna – report made of unidentified related form or using admittedly obsolete nomenclature
  - †Perna texana
- †Perrisonota
  - †Perrisonota littlei
  - †Perrisonota protexta
- Petrophyllia
- †Phacellocoenia – tentative report
  - †Phacellocoenia tolmachoffana – type locality for species
- Phacoides
  - †Phacoides mattiformis
- †Pharodina
  - †Pharodina ferrana
- †Phelopteria
  - †Phelopteria dalli
  - †Phelopteria linguaeformis
  - †Phelopteria timberensis
- Pholadidea
  - †Pholadidea ragsdalensis
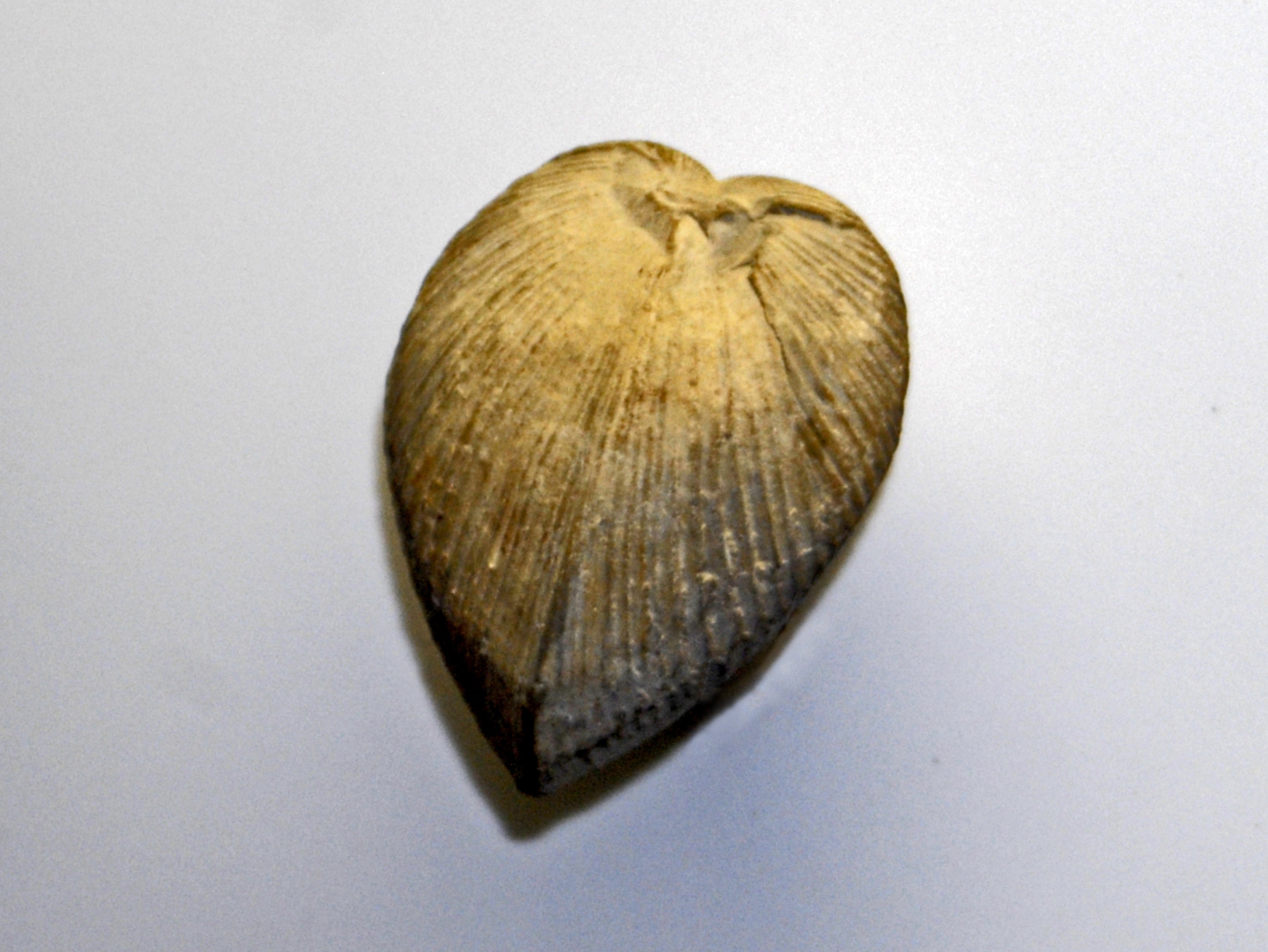
- Fossilized shell of the Early Triassic-Pliocene marine bivalve Pholadomya
  Pholadomya
  - †Pholadomya coahuilensis
  - †Pholadomya goldenensis
  - †Pholadomya ingens
  - †Pholadomya littlei
  - †Pholadomya occidentalis
  - †Pholadomya shattucki
- Pholas
  - †Pholas scaphoides
- †Phyllobrissus
  - †Phyllobrissus cubensis
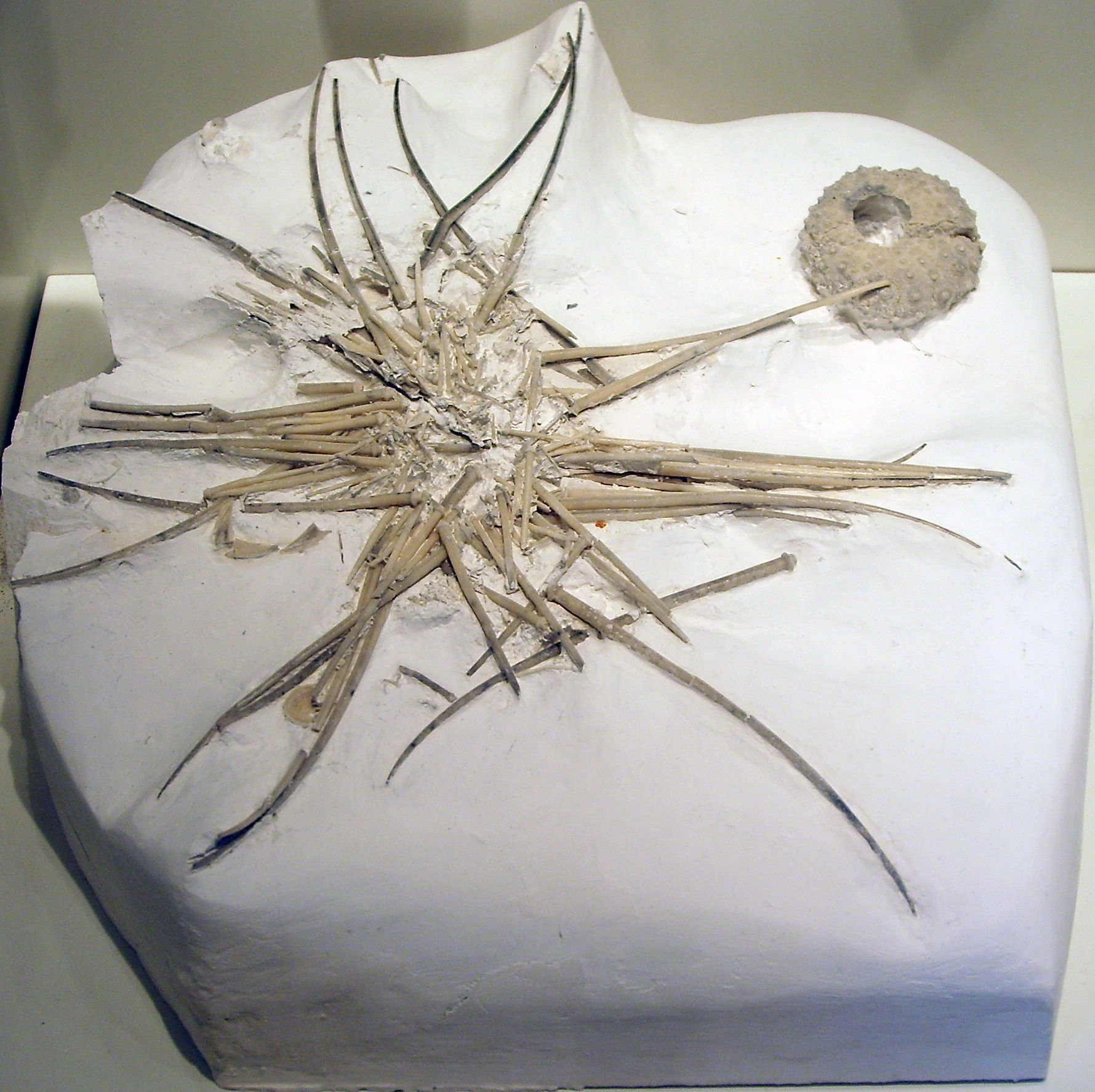
- Phymosoma
  †Phymosoma
  - †Phymosoma hilli
- †Phytosaurus
- †Piestochilus
  - †Piestochilus curviliratus
  - †Piestochilus levis
- †Pinella
  - †Pinella reticulata
- †Pinna
  - †Pinna laqueata
- †Pirsila
  - †Pirsila decora
  - †Pirsila simpla
  - †Pirsila tensa
- Pitar
  - †Pitar yoakumi
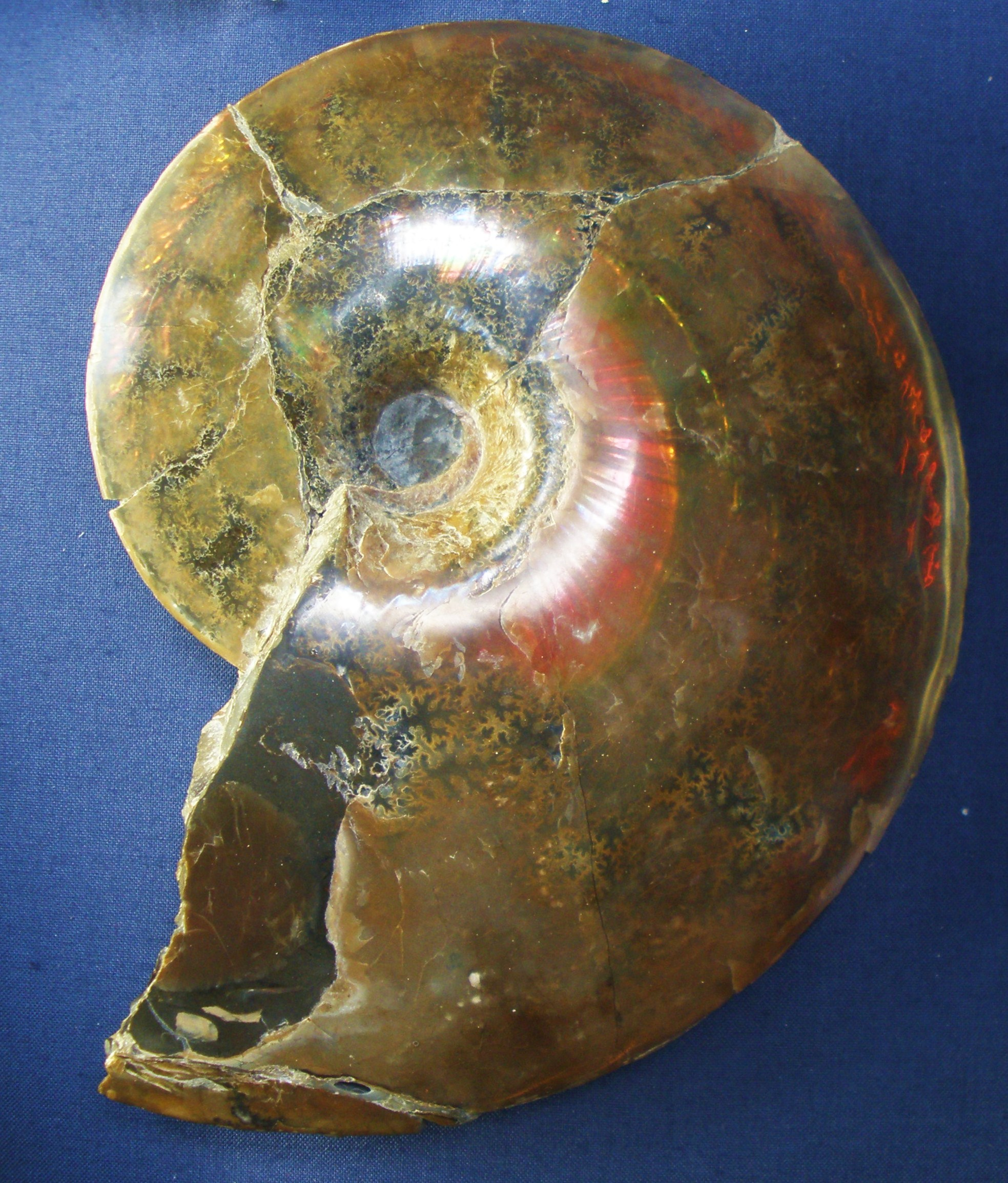
- Fossilized shell of the Late Cretaceous ammonoid cephalopod Placenticeras
  †Placenticeras
  - †Placenticeras interealare
  - †Placenticeras meeki
  - †Placenticeras syrtale
- Placopsilina
  - †Placopsilina minima
- †Placotrochus
  - †Placotrochus texanus
- Plagioecia
- †Planocephalosaurus
  - †Planocephalosaurus lucasi – type locality for species
- Planulina
  - †Planulina eaglefordensis
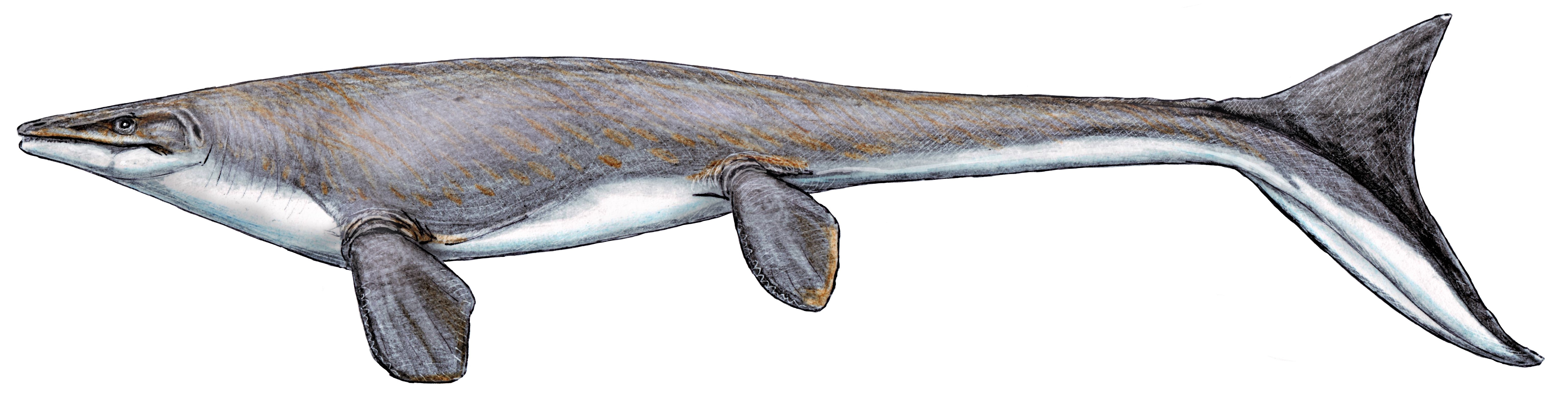
- Restoration of the Late Cretaceous mosasaur Platecarpus
  †Platecarpus
  - †Platecarpus planifrons
  - †Platecarpus somenensis – or unidentified comparable form
  - †Platecarpus tympaniticus
- †Platiknemiceras
  - †Platiknemiceras flexuosum
- †Platyceramus
  - †Platyceramus cycloides
  - †Platyceramus mantelli - or unidentified loosely related form
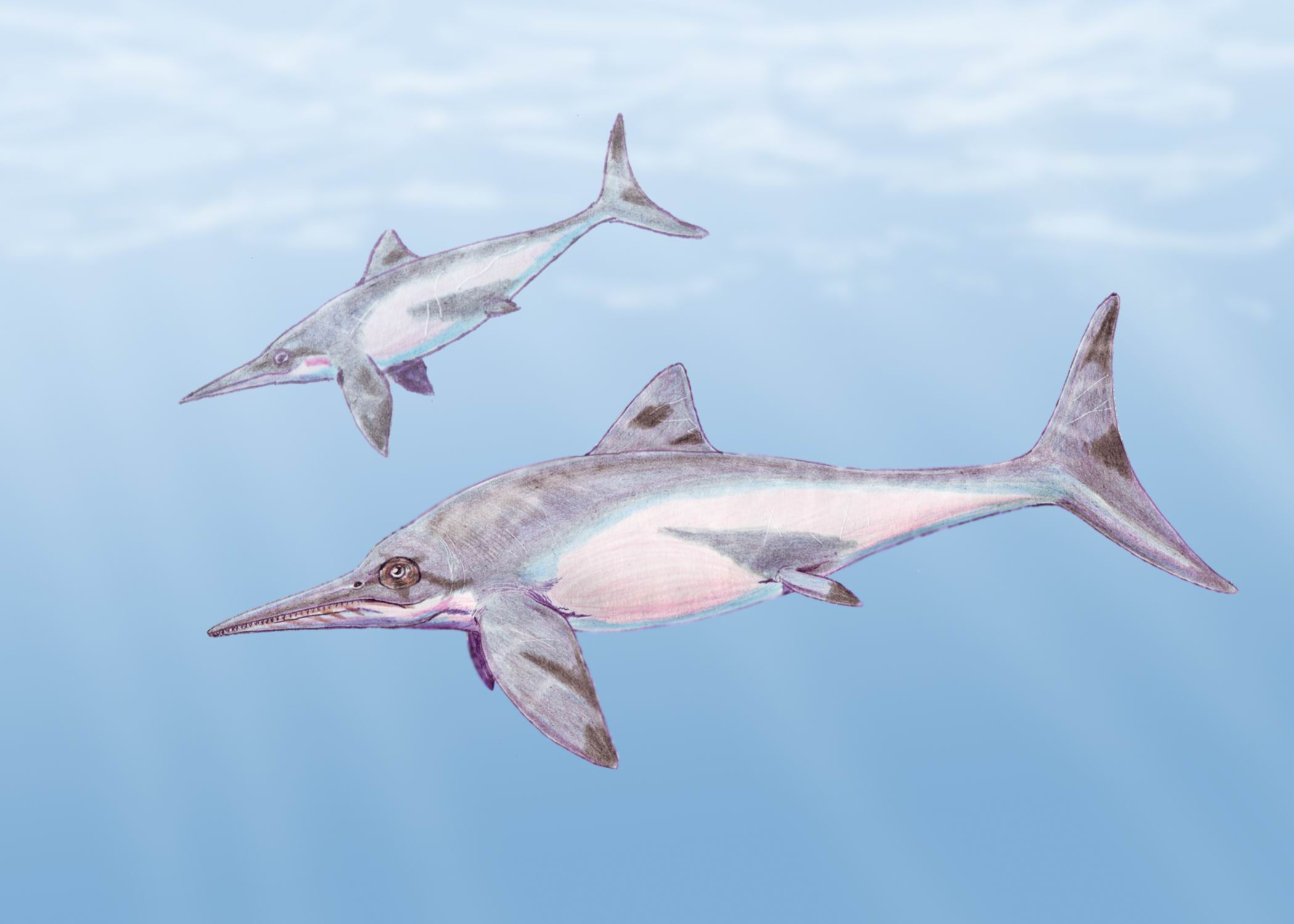
- Life restoration of the Early-Late Cretaceous ichthyosaur Platypterygius
  †Platypterygius
- †Plesiacanthoceras
  - †Plesiacanthoceras bellsanum
- †Plesiosaurus
- †Pleuriocardia
  - †Pleuriocardia eufaulense
  - †Pleuriocardia eufaulensis huntanum
- †Pleurocora
  - †Pleurocora coalescens
- †Pleuromya
  - †Pleuromya inconstans
- †Pleurosmilia
  - †Pleurosmilia quaylei – type locality for species
  - †Pleurosmilia saxifisi – type locality for species
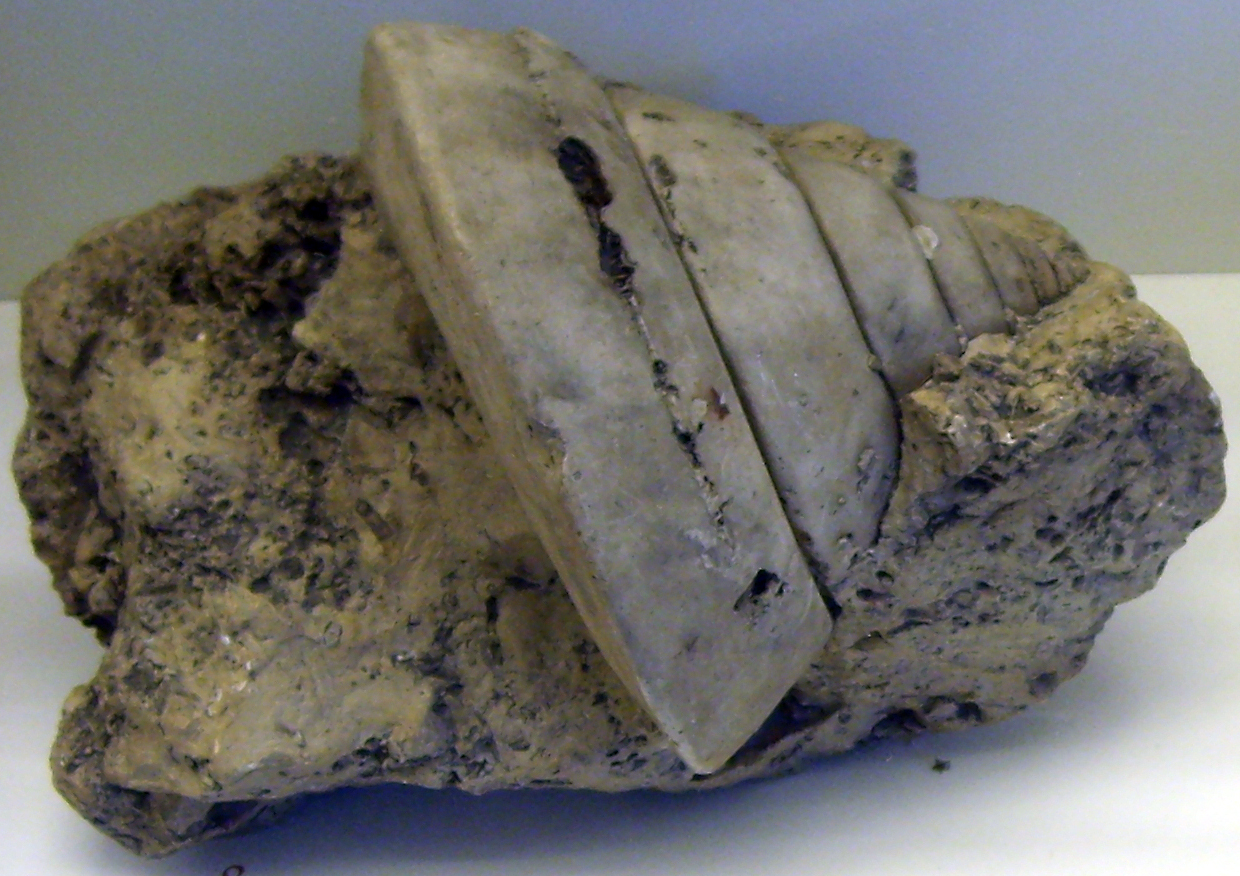
- Fossilized shell of a Pleurotomaria slit snail
  Pleurotomaria
  - †Pleurotomaria macilenta
- †Plicatolamna – or unidentified comparable form
  - †Plicatolamna arcuata
- †Plicatoscyllium – type locality for genus
  - †Plicatoscyllium antiquum – type locality for species
  - †Plicatoscyllium derameei – type locality for species
- Plicatula
  - †Plicatula clarki
  - †Plicatula dentonensis
  - †Plicatula goldenana
  - †Plicatula incongrua
  - †Plicatula mullicaensis
  - †Plicatula tetrica
- †Plioaxius
  - †Plioaxius texensis
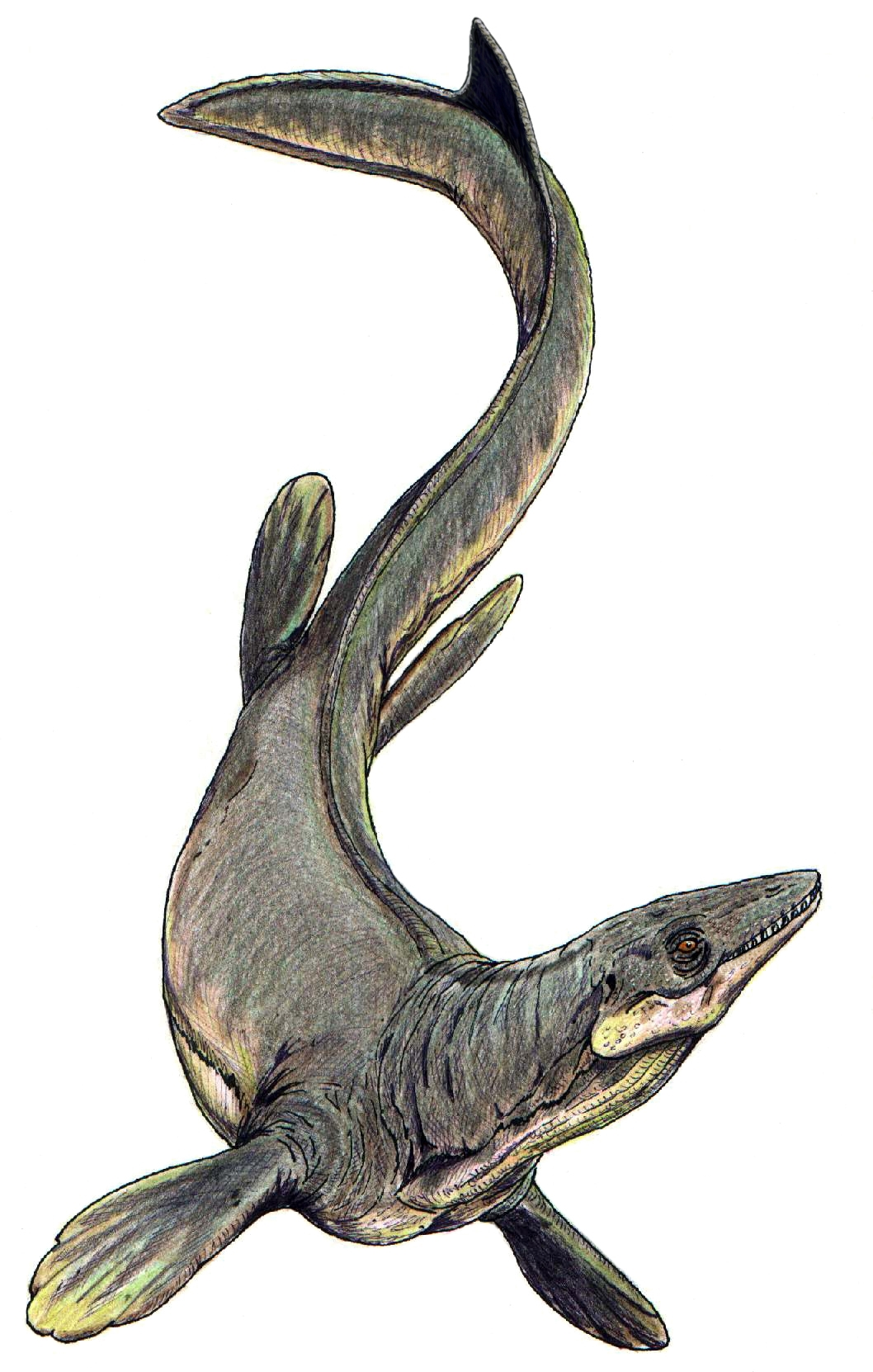
- Life restoration of the Late Cretaceous mosasaur Plioplatecarpus
  †Plioplatecarpus – tentative report
- †Poecilocrinus
  - †Poecilocrinus dispandus
- Polinices
  - †Polinices kummeli
  - †Polinices stephensoni
- †Pollex
  - †Pollex angulatus
  - †Pollex obesus
- †Polyacrodus
  - †Polyacrodus parvidens – or unidentified related form
- †Polyptychodon
  - †Polyptychodon hudsoni – type locality for species
- †Polytremacis
  - †Polytremacis hancockensis – type locality for species
  - †Polytremacis urgonensis
- †Pontocyprella
  - †Pontocyprella alexanderi
- †Poposaurus
  - †Poposaurus gracilis
  - †Poposaurus langstoni
- †Porituberoolithus
- †Postligata
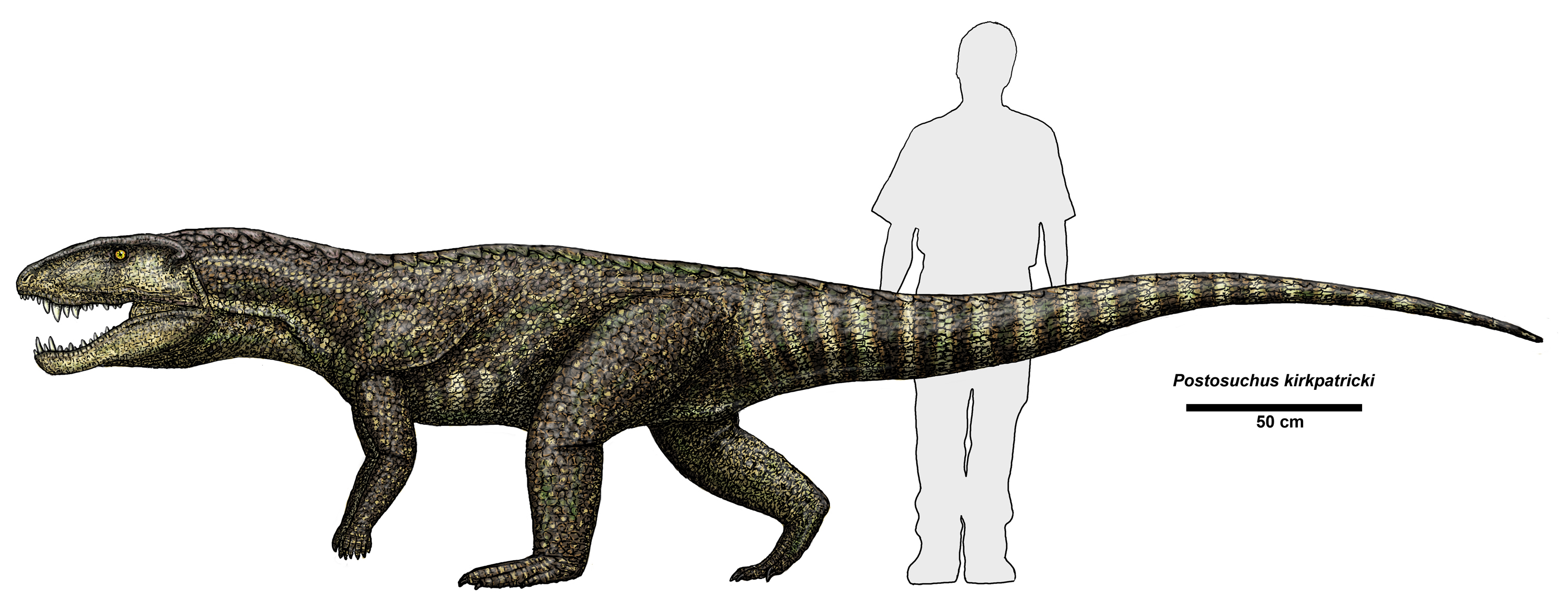
- Restoration of the Late Triassic crocodile relative Postosuchus with an anachronistic human to scale
  †Postosuchus – type locality for genus
  - †Postosuchus kirkpatricki – type locality for species
- †Praeleda
  - †Praeleda compar
- †Prionocyclites
  - †Prionocyclites mite
- †Prionocyclus
  - †Prionocyclus albinus
  - †Prionocyclus hyatti
  - †Prionocyclus macombi
  - †Prionocyclus wyomingensis
- †Priontropis
  - †Priontropis woolgari – or unidentified related form
- †Priscomactra
  - †Priscomactra cymba
  - †Priscomactra munda
- †Procardia
  - †Procardia torta
- †Procheloniceras
  - †Procheloniceras albrechtiaustriae – or unidentified related form
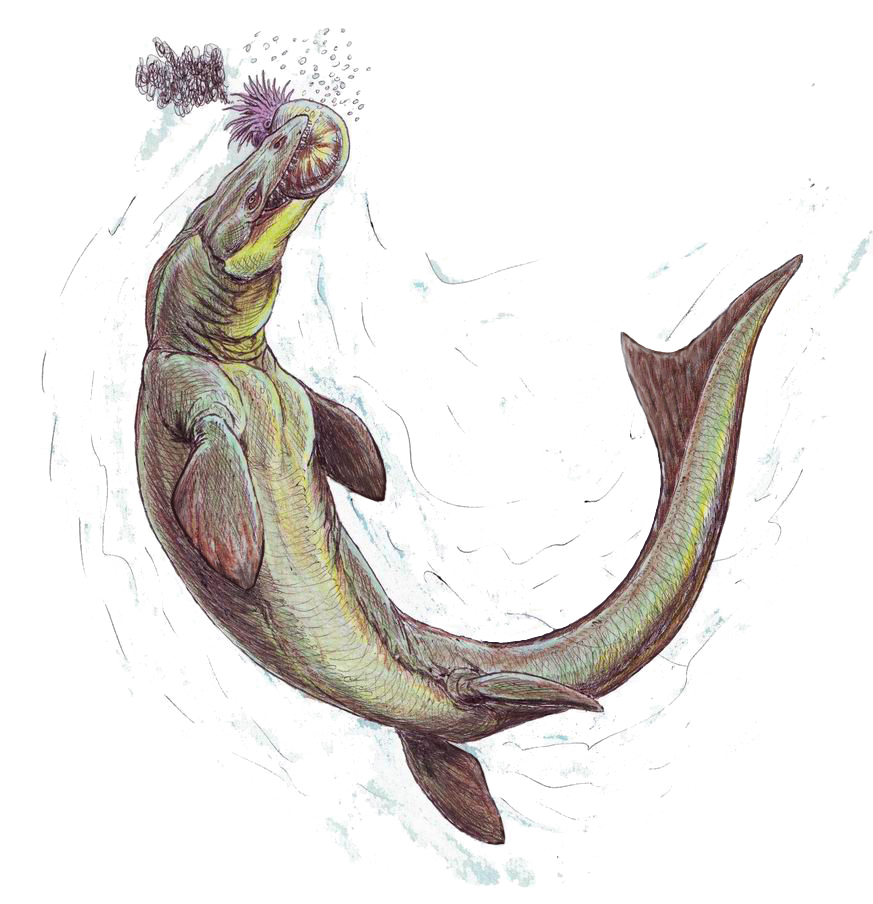
- Life restoration of the Late Cretaceous mosasaur Prognathodon preying upon an ammonoid cephalopod
  †Prognathodon – tentative report
- †Promystriosuchus – type locality for genus
  - †Promystriosuchus ehleri – type locality for species
- †Proraster
  - †Proraster dalli
- †Proscincetes
  - †Proscincetes texanus
- †Prosiren – type locality for genus
  - †Prosiren elinorae – type locality for species
- †Protarca
  - †Protarca tramitensis
- †Protecovasaurus – type locality for genus
  - †Protecovasaurus lucasi – type locality for species
- †Protexanites
  - †Protexanites planatus
- †Protoavis – type locality for genus
  - †Protoavis texensis – type locality for species
- †Protocallianassa
  - †Protocallianassa pleuralum – type locality for species
- †Protocardia
  - †Protocardia guadalupense
  - †Protocardia hillana
  - †Protocardia marcosensis
  - †Protocardia spillmani
  - †Protocardia texana
  - †Protocardia timberensis
  - †Protocardia torta
  - †Protocardia wadei
- †Protodonax
  - †Protodonax lingulatus
  - †Protodonax lingulatus tensus
  - †Protodonax robustus
- †Protohadros – type locality for genus
  - †Protohadros byrdi – type locality for species
- †Protoplatyrhina
  - †Protoplatyrhina renae
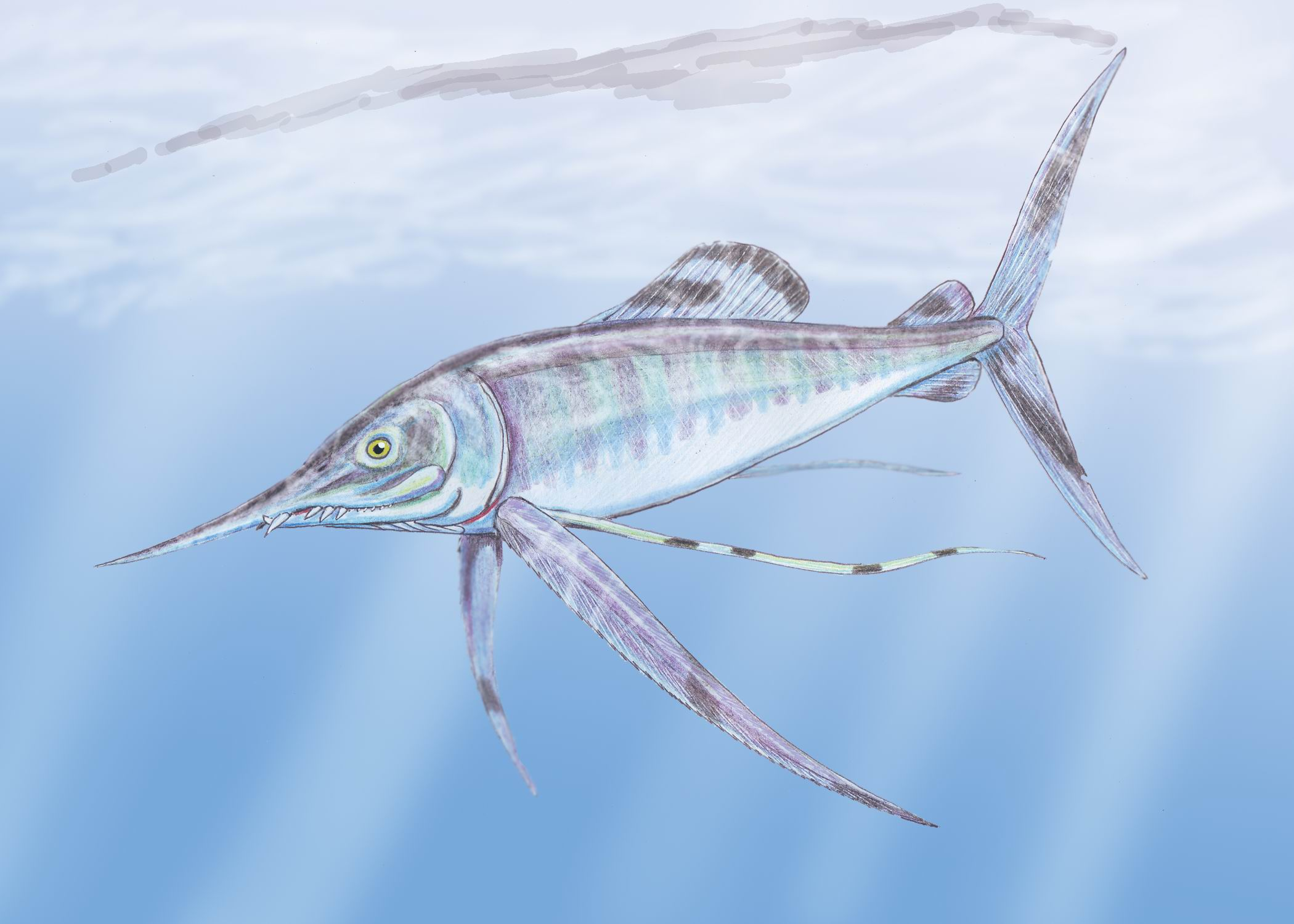
- Life restoration of the Late Cretaceous bony fish Protosphyraena
  †Protosphyraena
- †Proxestops
- †Pseudananchys
  - †Pseudananchys stephensoni – type locality for species
- †Pseudaspidoceras
  - †Pseudaspidoceras flexuosum
- †Pseudocalycoceras
  - †Pseudocalycoceras angolaense
- †Pseudoclavulina
  - †Pseudoclavulina clavata
- †Pseudocoeniopsis – tentative report
  - †Pseudocoeniopsis wintoni – type locality for species
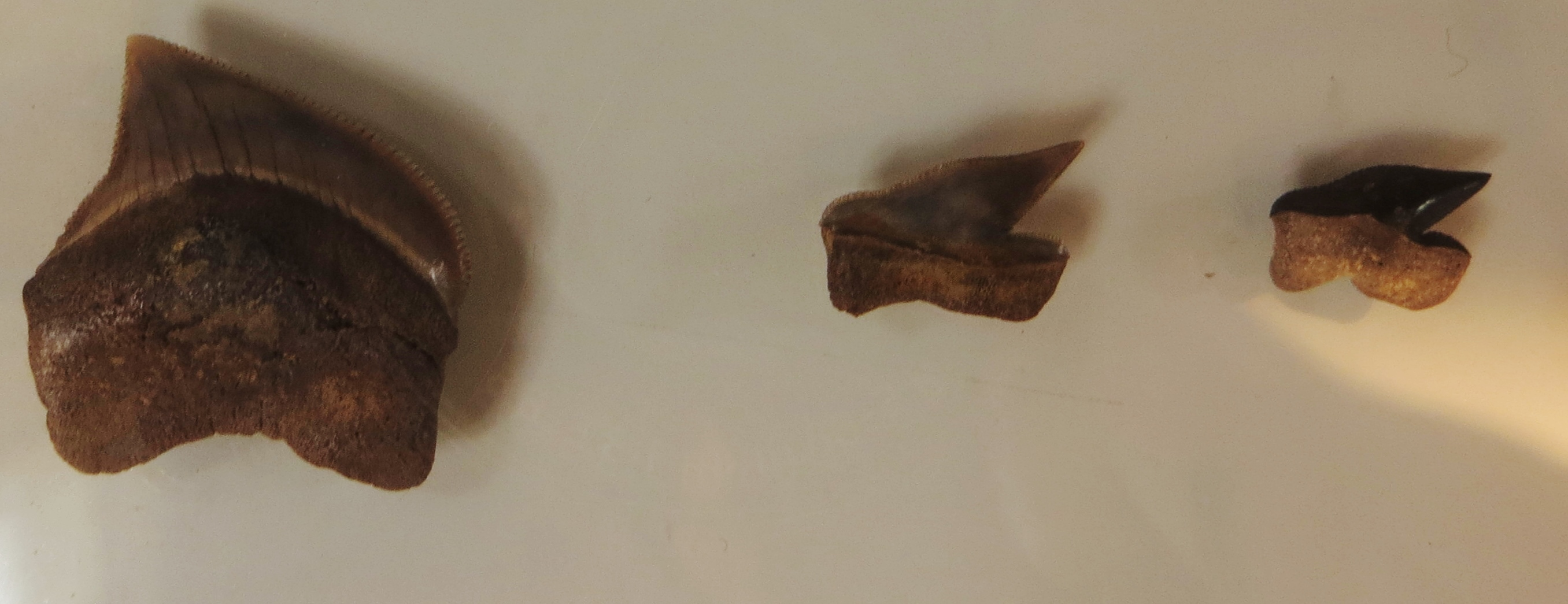
- Fossilized teeth of the Cretaceous shark Pseudocorax
  †Pseudocorax
  - †Pseudocorax granti
- †Pseudogaudryinella
  - †Pseudogaudryinella capitosa
- †Pseudohypolophus
- †Pseudolimea
  - †Pseudolimea kimbroensis
  - †Pseudolimea reticulata
  - †Pseudolimea sellardsi
- Pseudomalaxis
  - †Pseudomalaxis patens
  - †Pseudomalaxis pateriformis
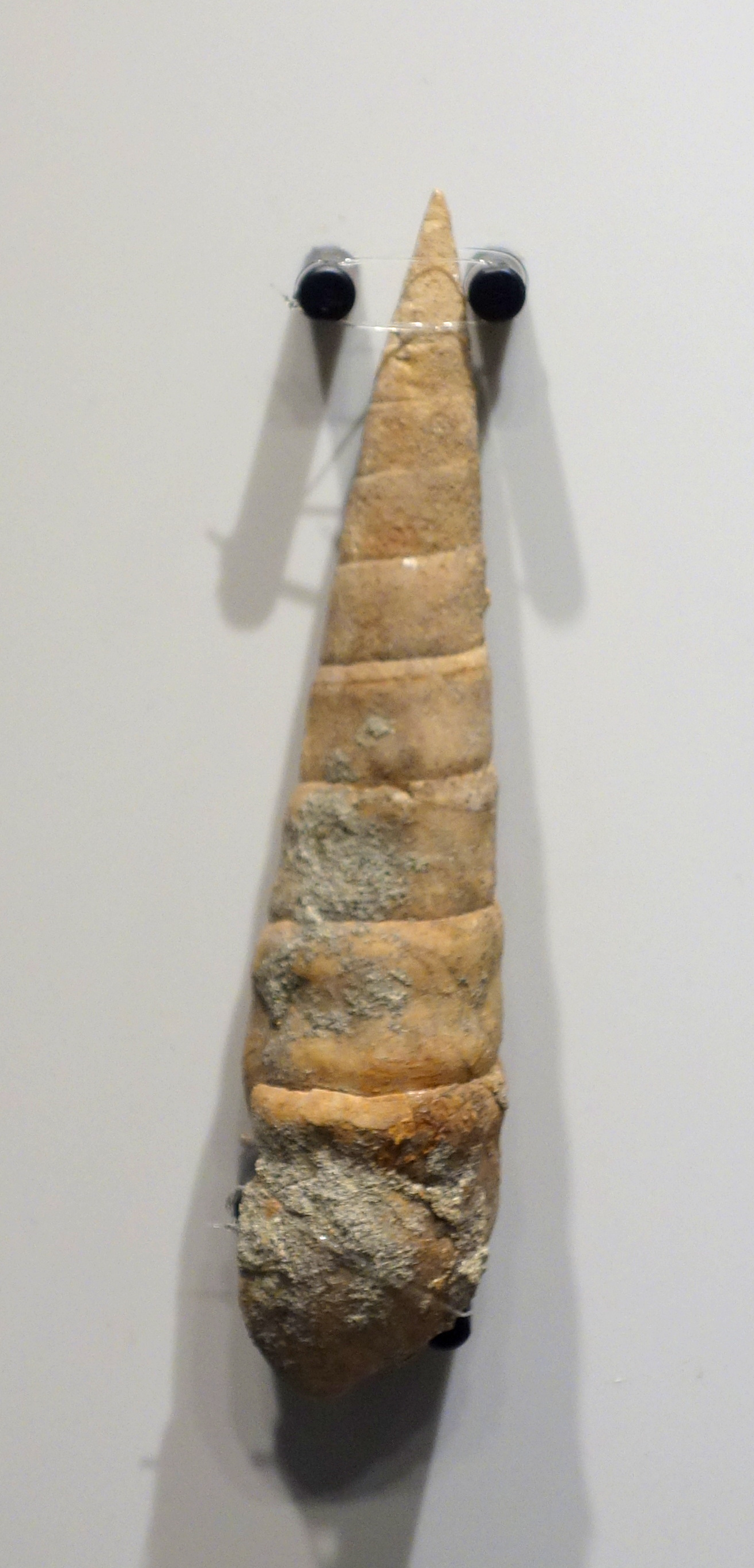
- Fossilized shell of a Pseudomelania sea snail
  †Pseudomelania
  - †Pseudomelania basicostata
  - †Pseudomelania ferrata
  - †Pseudomelania roanokana
- †Pseudoncrocarcinus
  - †Pseudoncrocarcinus scotti
- †Pseudoperna
  - †Pseudoperna congesta
- †Pseudopetalodontia
  - †Pseudopetalodontia felixi
- †Pseudoptera
  - †Pseudoptera hornensis
  - †Pseudoptera hornesis
  - †Pseudoptera rushana
  - †Pseudoptera serrata
  - †Pseudoptera viana
- †Psilomya
  - †Psilomya concentrica
  - †Psilomya levis
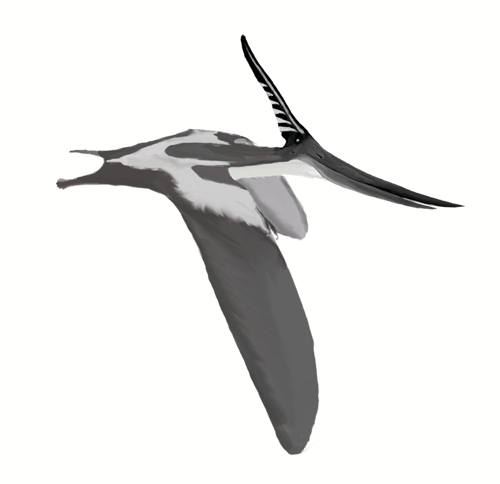
- Life restoration of the Late Cretaceous pterosaur Pteranodon
  †Pteranodon – or unidentified comparable form
- †Pteria
  - †Pteria linguaeformis – tentative report
  - †Pteria rhombica
- †Pterocerella
  - †Pterocerella densatus
  - †Pterocerella densatus nacatochanus
  - †Pterocerella poinsettiformis
  - †Pterocerella robustus
- †Pterot
  - †Pterot castrovillensis – or unidentified related form
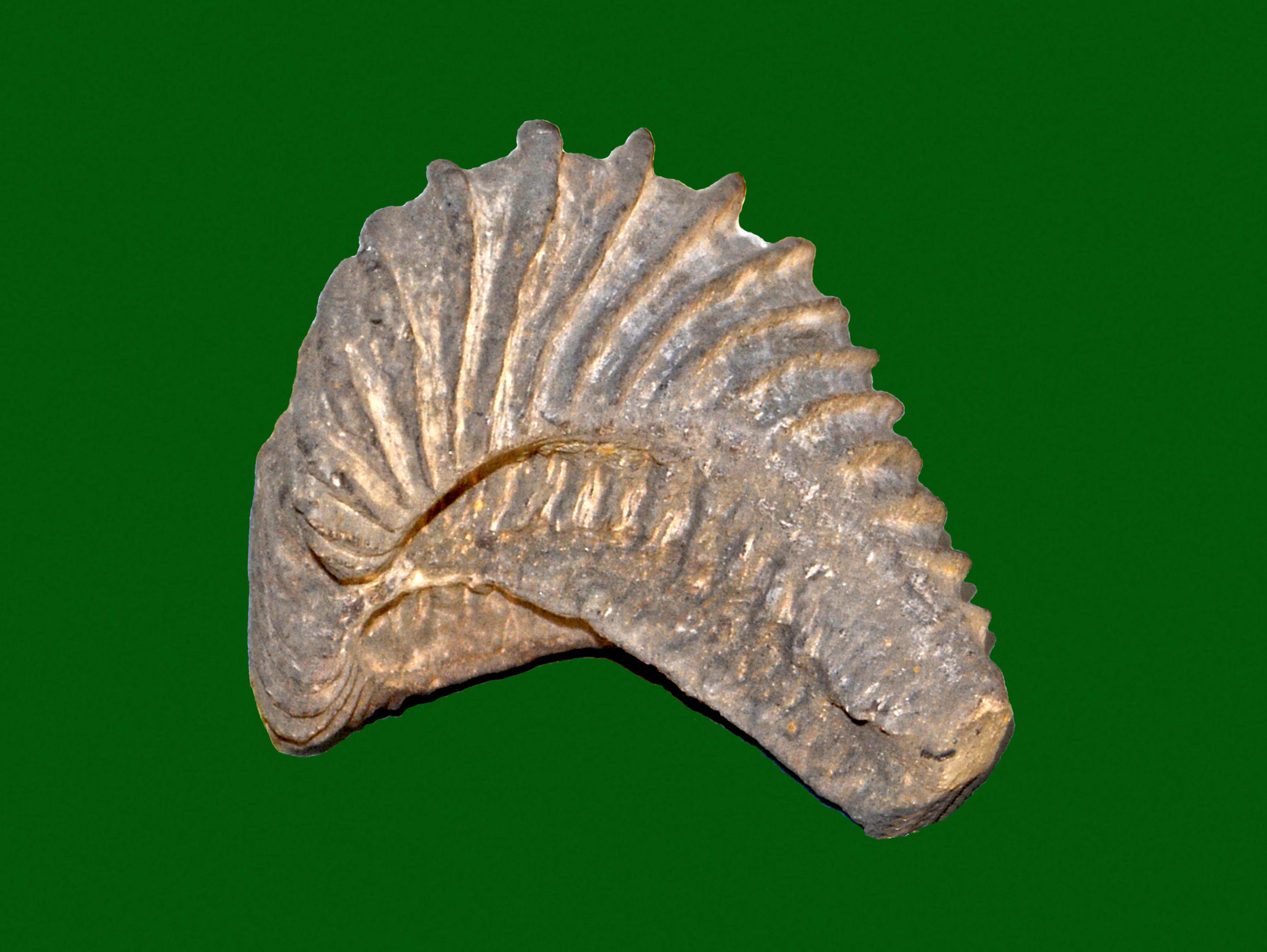
- Fossilized shell of the Jurassic-Cretaceous marine bivalve Pterotrigonia
  †Pterotrigonia
  - †Pterotrigonia castrovillensis
  - †Pterotrigonia eufalensis
  - †Pterotrigonia eufaulensis
  - †Pterotrigonia eufaulensis gabbi
  - †Pterotrigonia marionensis
  - †Pterotrigonia stantoni
- †Ptychomya
  - †Ptychomya stantonii
- †Ptychotrygon
  - †Ptychotrygon vermiculata
  - †Ptychotrygon winni – type locality for species
- †Pugnellus
  - †Pugnellus densatus
  - †Pugnellus goldmani
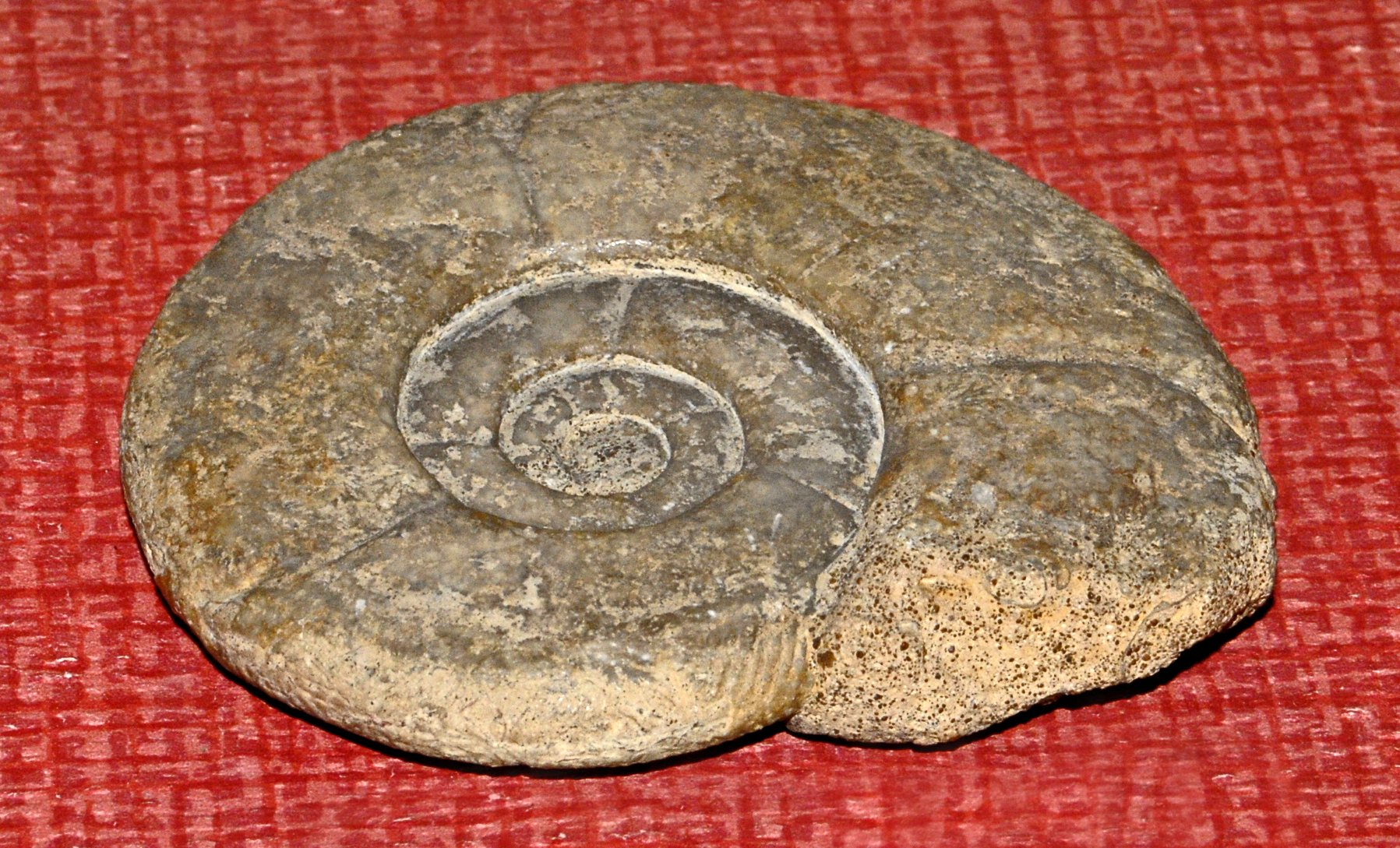
- Fossilized shell of the Early-Late Cretaceous ammonoid cephalopod Puzosia
  †Puzosia
  - †Puzosia crebrisulcata – or unidentified comparable form
- Pycnodonte
  - †Pycnodonte belli
  - †Pycnodonte mutabilis
  - †Pycnodonte vesicularis
- †Pycnomicrodon
  - †Pycnomicrodon texanus
- †Pyrgulifera
  - †Pyrgulifera costata
  - †Pyrgulifera costata sublevis
  - †Pyrgulifera costata tuberata
  - †Pyrgulifera ornata
- †Pyrifusus
- †Pyrina
  - †Pyrina parryi
- †Pyropsis
  - †Pyropsis lanhami
  - †Pyropsis proxima – or unidentified related form

== Q ==
- †Quayia – or unidentified comparable form
  - †Quayia zideki
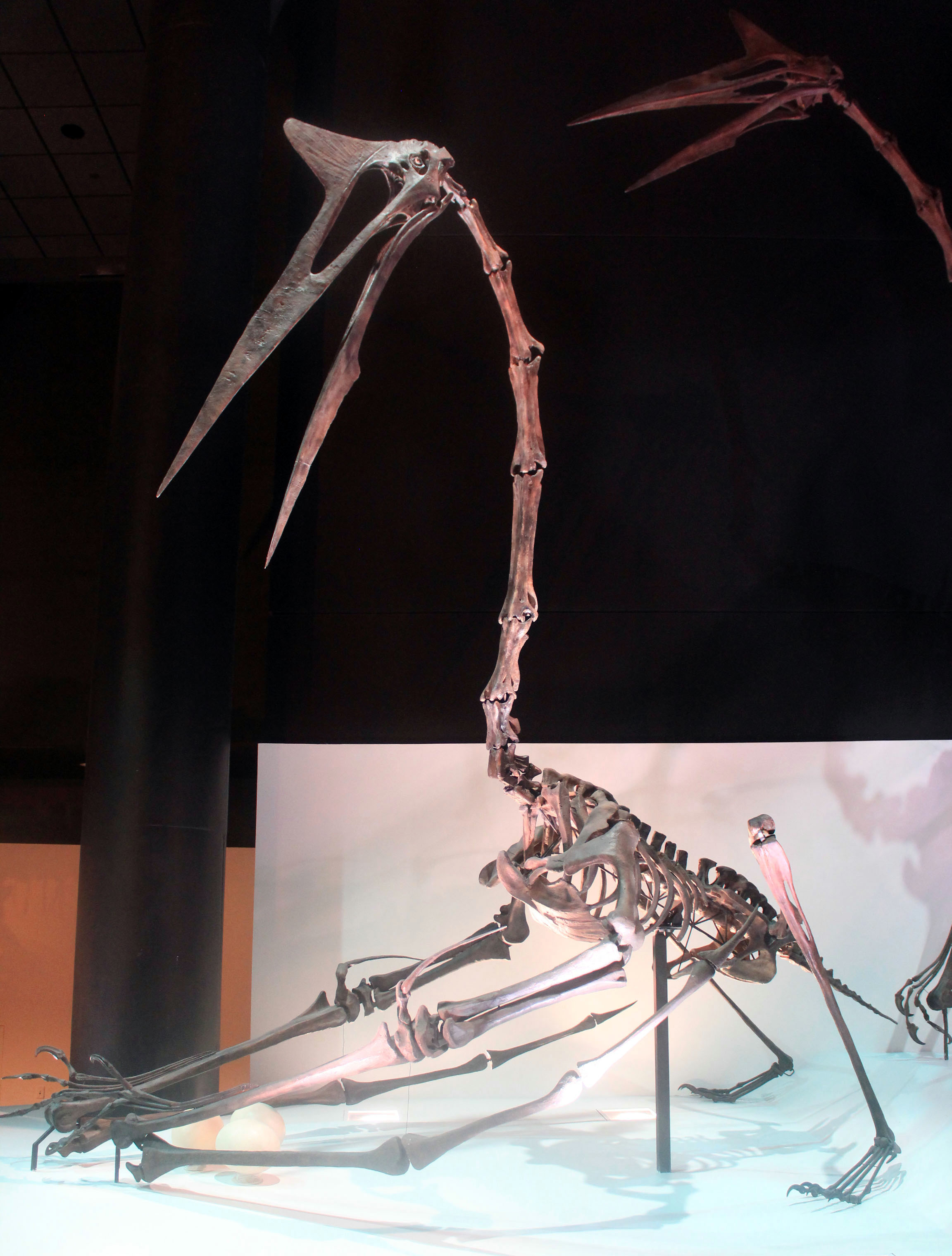
- Mounted fossilized skeleton of the Late Cretaceous pterosaur Quetzalcoatlus
  †Quetzalcoatlus – type locality for genus
  - †Quetzalcoatlus northropi – type locality for species
- †Quitmaniceras
  - †Quitmaniceras reaseri
- †Quitmanites
  - †Quitmanites ceratitosus
  - †Quitmanites evolutus

== R ==
- †Rachiosoma
  - †Rachiosoma hondoensis – type locality for species
- †Radiopecten
  - †Radiopecten mississippiensis
- Raja
  - †Raja farishi – type locality for species
- †Ramsetia
  - †Ramsetia whitfieldi
- †Raninella
- †Remera
  - †Remera decora
  - †Remera juncea
  - †Remera microstriata
- †Remnita
  - †Remnita anomalocostata
  - †Remnita biacuminata
- †Remondia
  - †Remondia robbinsi
- Reophax
  - †Reophax deckeri
- †Reptomulticava
- †Restes
- †Rewaconodon – or unidentified related form
  - †Rewaconodon tikiensis
- †Rhamphidoceras – type locality for genus
  - †Rhamphidoceras saxatilis – type locality for species
- Rhinobatos
  - †Rhinobatos craddocki – type locality for species
  - †Rhinobatos uvulatus – type locality for species
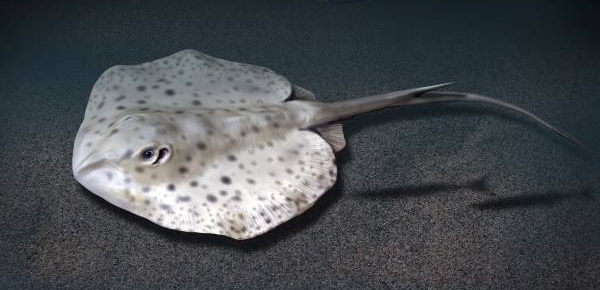
- Restoration of the Late Cretaceous-Paleocene ray Rhombodus
  †Rhombodus
  - †Rhombodus binkhorsti
- †Rhytidohoplites
  - †Rhytidohoplites robertsi
- †Rhytophorus – tentative report
- †Richardoestesia
  - †Richardoestesia gilmorei
  - †Richardoestesia isosceles – type locality for species
- †Rileymillerus – type locality for genus
  - †Rileymillerus cosgriffi – type locality for species
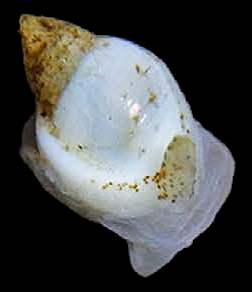
- A living Ringicula sea snail
  Ringicula
  - †Ringicula anfractoline
  - †Ringicula arlingtonensis
  - †Ringicula culbertsoni
  - †Ringicula pulchella
  - †Ringicula sufflata
- Rogerella
  - †Rogerella cragini – type locality for species
- †Romaniceras
  - †Romaniceras aguilerai
  - †Romaniceras zacatecana
- Rostellaria – tentative report
  - †Rostellaria robertsi
- †Russellosaurus – type locality for genus
  - †Russellosaurus coheni – type locality for species
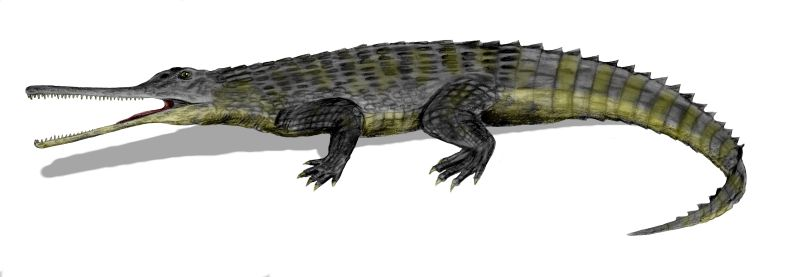
- Life restoration of the Late Triassic phytosaur Rutiodon
  †Rutiodon

== S ==
- Salenia
  - †Salenia hondoensis – type locality for species
- †Sanmiguelia
- †Sanoarca
  - †Sanoarca faucana
  - †Sanoarca grandis
- †Sargana
  - †Sargana stantoni
- Diagram illustrating the Early Cretaceous long-necked dinosaur Sauroposeidon with anachronistic humans to scale
  †Sauroposeidon
  - †Sauroposeidon proteles
- †Saurornitholestes
  - †Saurornitholestes langstoni – or unidentified comparable form
- †Sauvagesia – tentative report
  - †Sauvagesia hilli
- †Saynella
  - †Saynella hilli
- Scalpellum – tentative report
- †Scambula
  - †Scambula perplana
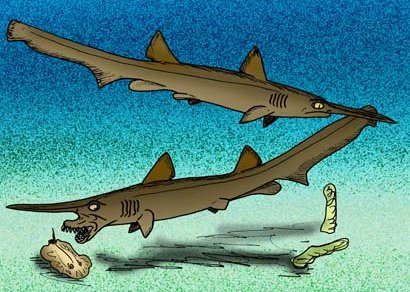
- Restoration of several of the Early Cretaceous-Miocene shark Scapanorhynchus
  †Scapanorhynchus
  - †Scapanorhynchus texanus
  - †Scapanorhynchus textanus
- †Scapherpeton
- †Scaphites
  - †Scaphites bosquensis – type locality for species
  - †Scaphites brittonensis
  - †Scaphites hippocrepis - or unidentified loosely related form
  - †Scaphites rugosus
  - †Scaphites warreni
  - †Scaphites yorkensis
- †Schizobasis
- Scintilla – tentative report
  - †Scintilla ramoni
- †Sciponoceras
  - †Sciponoceras gracile
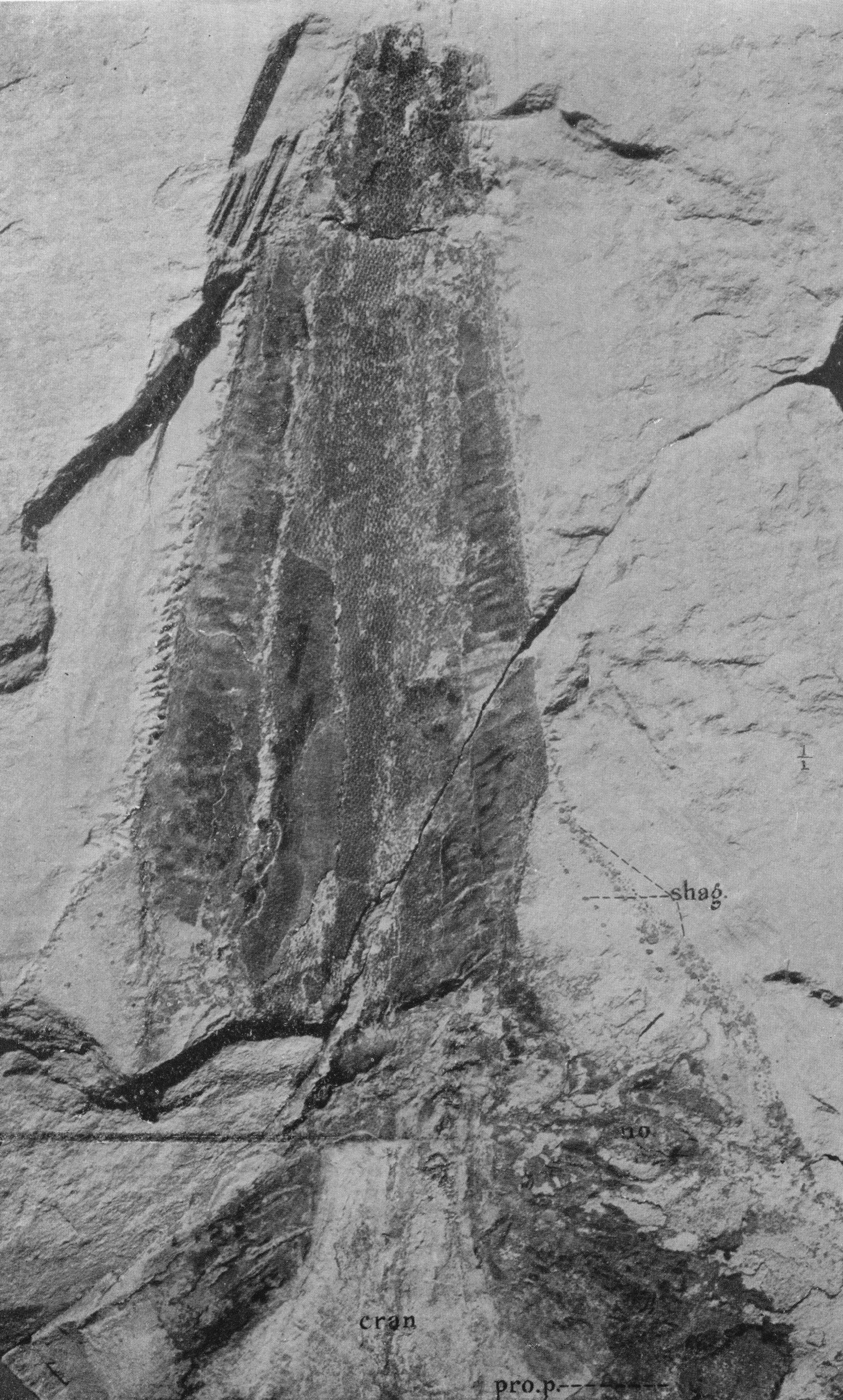
- Fossilized snout of the Late Cretaceous ray relative Sclerorhynchus
  †Sclerorhynchus
  - †Sclerorhynchus pettersi – type locality for species
- †Scolomastax – type locality for genus
  - †Scolomastax sahlsteini – type locality for species
- Scyliorhinus
  - †Scyliorhinus ivagrantae – type locality for species
- †Selaginella – or unidentified comparable form
- †Seminodicrescis
- †Seminola – tentative report
- †Semiometra
  - †Semiometra minuta
- †Semionotus – or unidentified comparable form
- †Senis
  - †Senis elongata
  - †Senis elongatus
- Serpula
  - †Serpula cretacea
  - †Serpula implicata
  - †Serpula lineata
- †Serratolamna
  - †Serratolamna serrata
- †Sexta
  - †Sexta ethelana
  - †Sexta navicula
- †Sharpeiceras
  - †Sharpeiceras schlueteri
  - †Sharpeiceras tlahualiloense
- †Shuparoceras
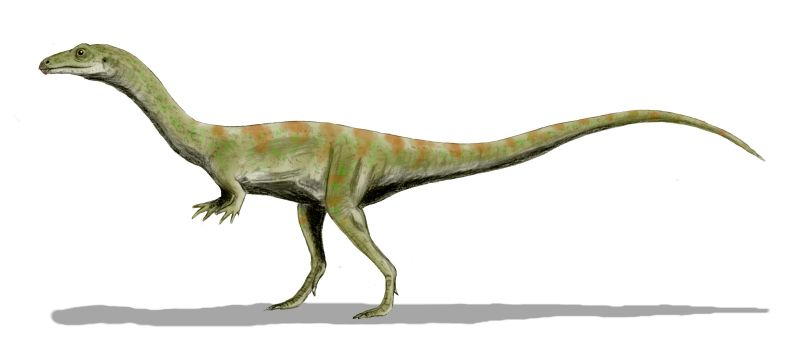
- Life restoration of the Late Triassic distant crocodilian relative Shuvosaurus
  †Shuvosaurus – type locality for genus
  - †Shuvosaurus inexpectatus – type locality for species
- †Siderastrea
  - †Siderastrea tuckerae – type locality for species
- †Siderofungia
  - †Siderofungia irregularis
- †Sierritasuchus – type locality for genus
  - †Sierritasuchus macalpini – type locality for species
- †Sinonia
  - †Sinonia levis
- †Siphodictyum
- Siphotextularia
  - †Siphotextularia washitaensis
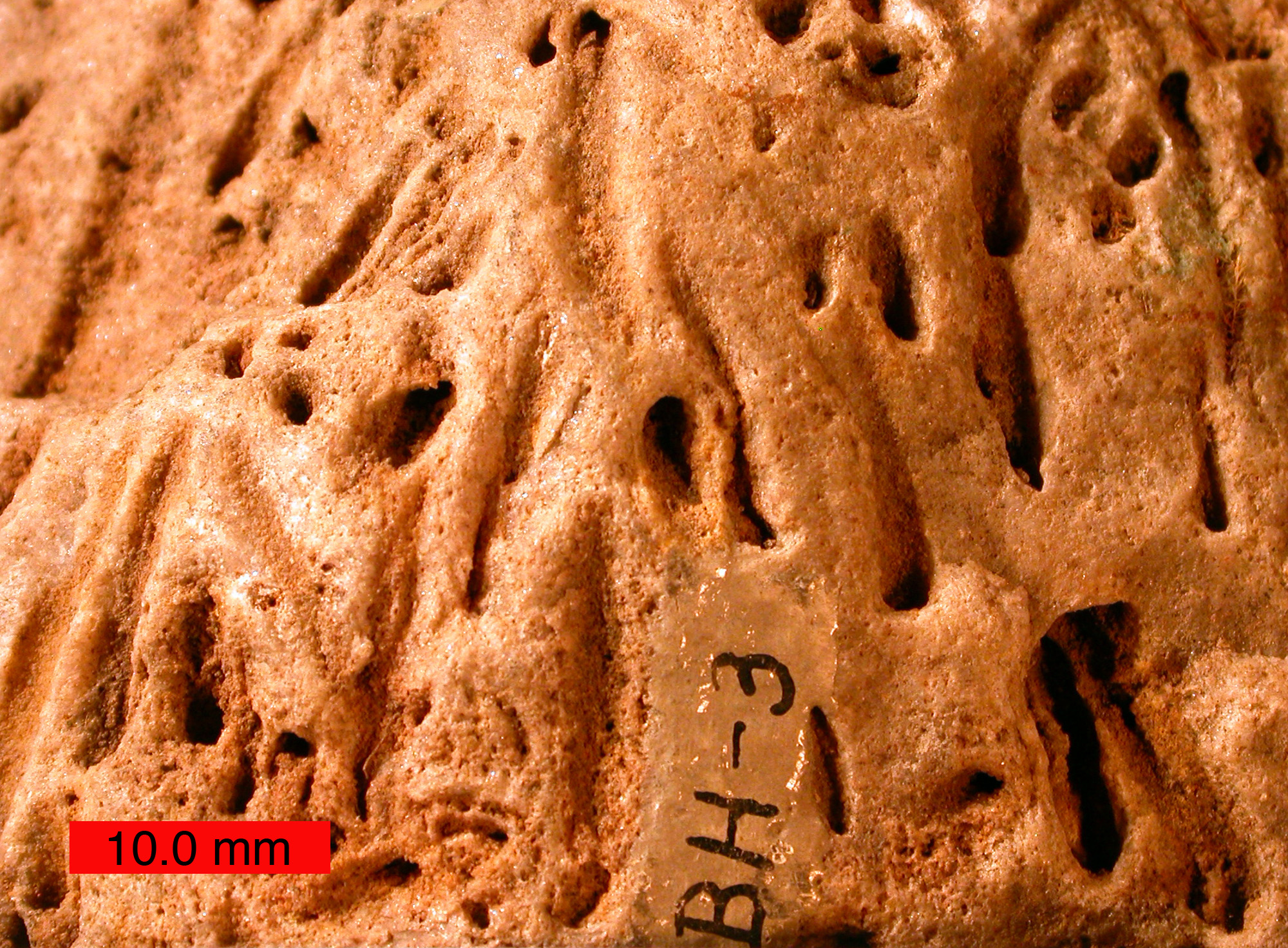
- Fossils of the Cambrian-modern worm burrow ichnogenus Skolithos
  †Skolithos
- Smilotrochus
  - †Smilotrochus palmerae – type locality for species
- †Solanocrinites
  - †Solanocrinites wertheimi
- Solemya
  - †Solemya bilix – tentative report
- †Solenoceras
  - †Solenoceras multicostatum
  - †Solenoceras reesidei
  - †Solenoceras texanum
- †Solyma
  - †Solyma bilix
  - †Solyma elliptica
  - †Solyma gardnerae
  - †Solyma parva
  - †Solyma stewarti
- †Spalacotheroides – type locality for genus
  - †Spalacotheroides bridwelli – type locality for species
- †Spathites
  - †Spathites coahuilaensis
  - †Spathites rioensis
- †Specus
  - †Specus fimbriatus
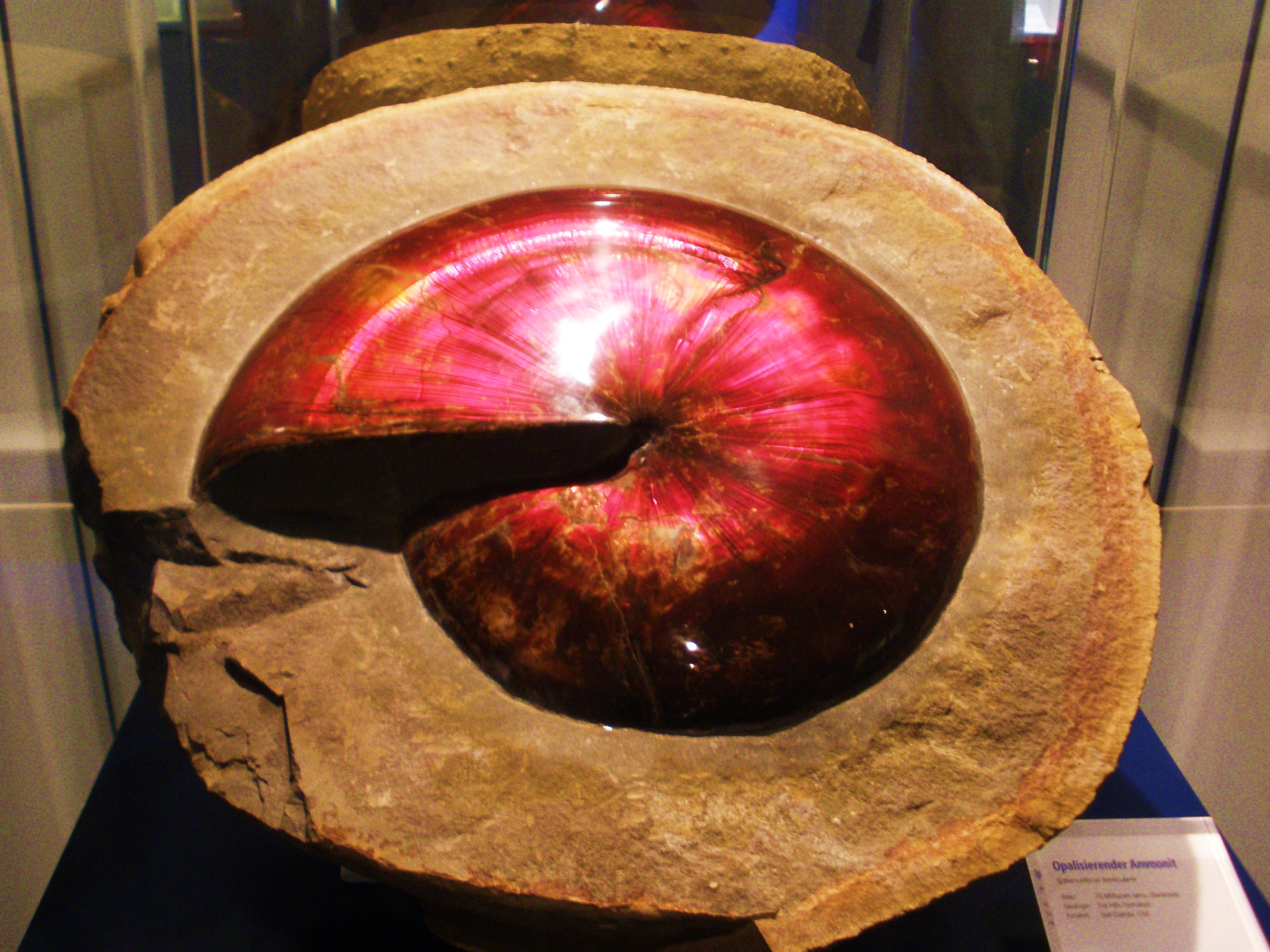
- Opalized shell of the Late Cretaceous ammonoid cephalopod Sphenodiscus
  †Sphenodiscus
  - †Sphenodiscus intermedius
  - †Sphenodiscus lobatus
  - †Sphenodiscus pleurisepta
  - †Sphenodiscus tirensis
- †Spinosuchus – type locality for genus
  - †Spinosuchus caseanus – type locality for species
- †Spironema
  - †Spironema perryi
- Spiroplectammina
  - †Spiroplectammina ammovitrea
  - †Spiroplectammina goodlandana
- Spondylus
  - †Spondylus hilli
  - †Spondylus munitus
  - †Spondylus siccus – type locality for species
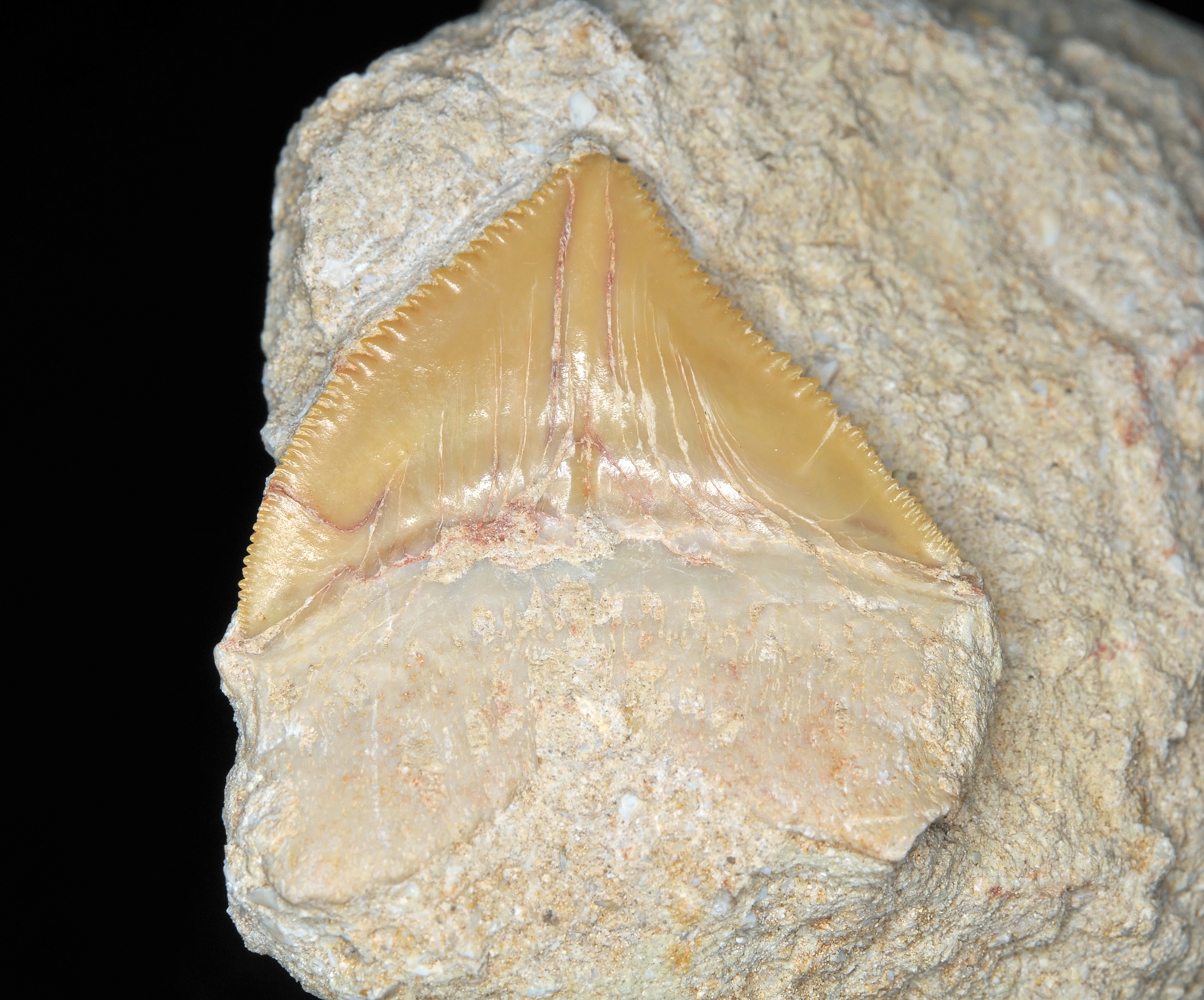
- Fossilized tooth of the Late Cretaceous shark Squalicorax
  Squalicorax
  - †Squalicorax kaupi
  - †Squalicorax pristodontus
- Squalus
  - †Squalus huntensis – type locality for species
- †Squatigaleus
  - †Squatigaleus sulphurensis – type locality for species
- †Squatirhina
  - †Squatirhina americana
- †Stamenocella
- †Stantonella
  - †Stantonella interrupta
- †Stearnsia
  - †Stearnsia robbinsi
- †Stelidioseris
  - †Stelidioseris bellensis – type locality for species
  - †Stelidioseris pattoni – type locality for species
  - †Stelidioseris whitneyi – type locality for species
- †Stellatopollis
- †Steorrosia
  - †Steorrosia aspera
- Stephanocoenia – tentative report
- †Stephanomorpha – tentative report
  - †Stephanomorpha saxirotundi – type locality for species
- †Stoliczkaia
  - †Stoliczkaia argonautiformis
  - †Stoliczkaia conlini – type locality for species
  - †Stoliczkaia crotaloides
  - †Stoliczkaia scotti
  - †Stoliczkaia texana – type locality for species
- Stomatopora
- †Stomohamites – tentative report
- Striarca
  - †Striarca cuneata
  - †Striarca plummeri
  - †Striarca saffordi
  - †Striarca webbervillensis
- †Striaticostatum
  - †Striaticostatum bexarense
  - †Striaticostatum pondi
  - †Striaticostatum sparsum
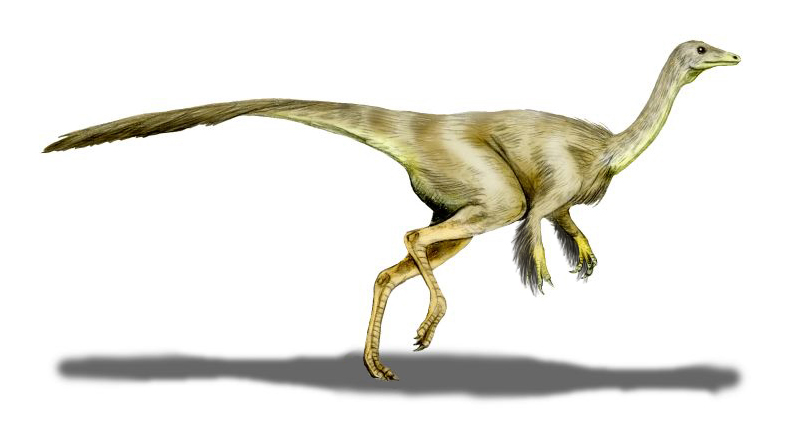
- Life restoration of the Late Cretaceous ostrich dinosaur Struthiomimus
  †Struthiomimus – or unidentified comparable form
- †Suarodon
- †Sumitomoceras
  - †Sumitomoceras bentonianum
- †Syncyclonema
  - †Syncyclonema archeri
  - †Syncyclonema kingi
  - †Syncyclonema simplicius
  - †Syncyclonema travisanus
- †Synorichthys – tentative report
  - †Synorichthys stewarti

== T ==
- †Tancredia – tentative report
- †Tanyosphaeridium
  - †Tanyosphaeridium salpinx
- †Tarrantites
  - †Tarrantites adkinsi
- †Tarrantoceras
  - †Tarrantoceras cuspidum
  - †Tarrantoceras sellardsi
- †Tarsomordeo – type locality for genus
  - †Tarsomordeo winkleri – type locality for species
- †Technosaurus – type locality for genus
  - †Technosaurus smalli – type locality for species
- †Tecovasaurus – type locality for genus
  - †Tecovasaurus murryi – type locality for species
- †Tecovasuchus – type locality for genus
  - †Tecovasuchus chatterjeei – type locality for species
- Teinostoma
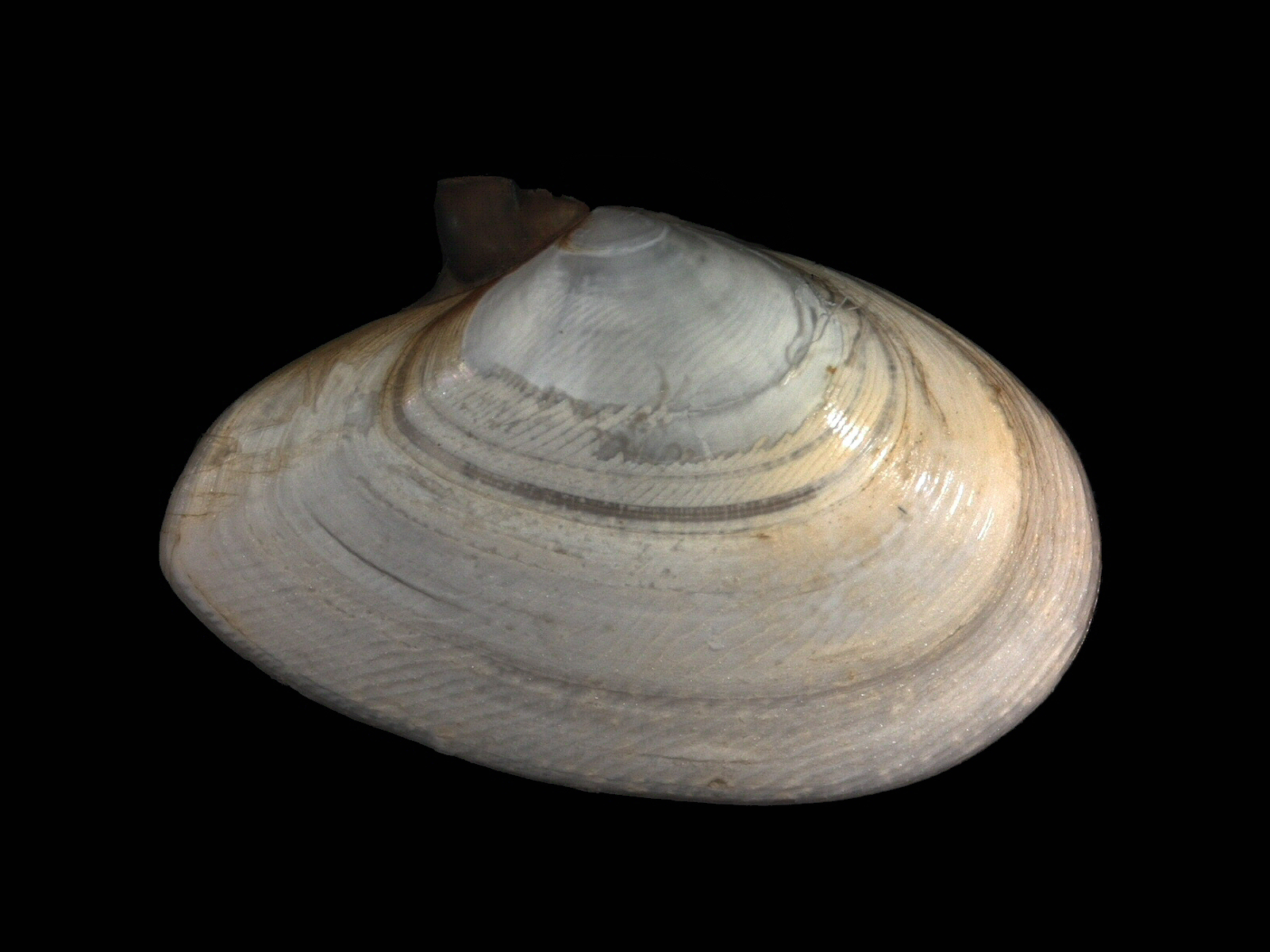
- Shell of a Tellina, or tellin
  Tellina
  - †Tellina duganensis
  - †Tellina dugansensis
  - †Tellina munda
  - †Tellina parkerana
  - †Tellina patula
  - †Tellina rivana
  - †Tellina stabulana
- †Tellinimera
  - †Tellinimera buboana
  - †Tellinimera gabbi
  - †Tellinimera munda
- †Tenea
  - †Tenea parilis
  - †Tenea patula
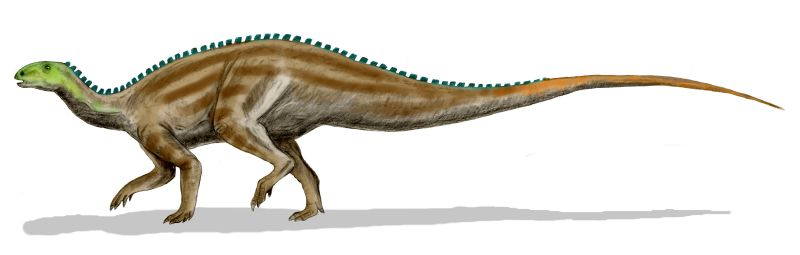
- Life restoration of the Early Cretaceous Iguanodon relative Tenontosaurus
  †Tenontosaurus
  - †Tenontosaurus dossi – type locality for species
- †Tentontosaurus
- †Tenuipteria
  - †Tenuipteria argentea
  - †Tenuipteria argenteus
- Terebratulina
  - †Terebratulina filosa
  - †Terebratulina noackensis
- †Terebrimya
  - †Terebrimya lamarana
- Teredolites
- †Terlinguachelys – type locality for genus
  - †Terlinguachelys fischbecki – type locality for species
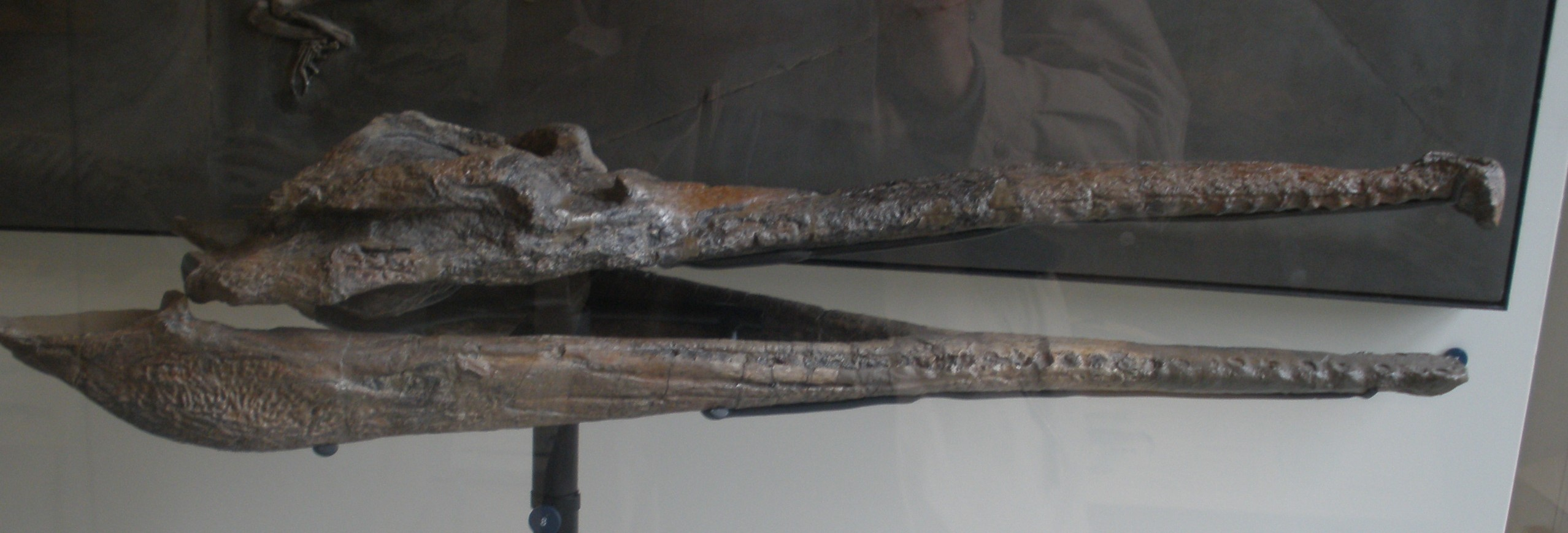
- Fossilized skull of the Late Cretaceous crocodilian relative Terminonaris
  †Terminonaris
  - †Terminonaris robusta – or unidentified comparable form
- †Tetragonites
  - †Tetragonites brazoensis – type locality for species
- †Texabatis – type locality for genus
  - †Texabatis corrugata – type locality for species
- †Texacephale – type locality for genus
  - †Texacephale langstoni – type locality for species
- †Texagryphea
- †Texanites
  - †Texanites dentatocarinatum
  - †Texanites gallicus
  - †Texanites vanhoepeni
- †Texasetes – type locality for genus
  - †Texasetes pleurohalio – type locality for species
- †Texasia
  - †Texasia dartoni
- †Texicaprina
  - †Texicaprina vivari
- †Texigryphaea
  - †Texigryphaea sashitaensis
- †Texigryphea
  - †Texigryphea washitaensis
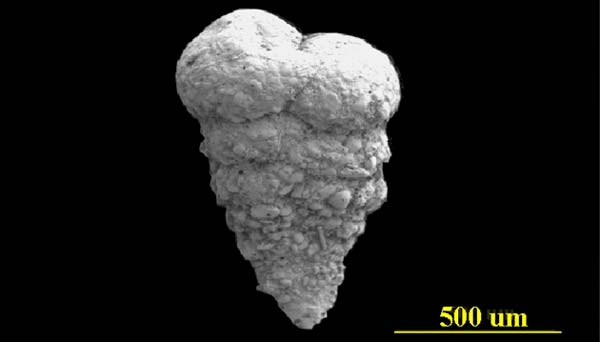
- Fossilized shell of the Carboniferous-modern foraminiferan Textularia
  Textularia
  - †Textularia losangica
  - †Textularia rioensis
- †Thamnasteria
  - †Thamnasteria hoffmeisteri – type locality for species
- †Thamnoseris – tentative report
  - †Thamnoseris morchella – type locality for species
- †Thecosmilia – tentative report
- †Thomasites
  - †Thomasites adkinsi
- †Thomelites
- †Thryptodus
  - †Thryptodus loomisi – type locality for species
- †Thylacus
  - †Thylacus cretaceus
- †Thyracella
- †Tiarasmilia – type locality for genus
  - †Tiarasmilia casteri – type locality for species
- †Tibiaporrhais – tentative report
  - †Tibiaporrhais cooperensis
- †Tintorium
  - †Tintorium pogodaformis – or unidentified comparable form
- †Titanosarcolites
  - †Titanosarcolites oddsensis
- †Tornatellaea
  - †Tornatellaea cretacea
  - †Tornatellaea eretacea
  - †Tornatellaea eretacea appressa
  - †Tornatellaea gramdis
  - †Tornatellaea scatesi
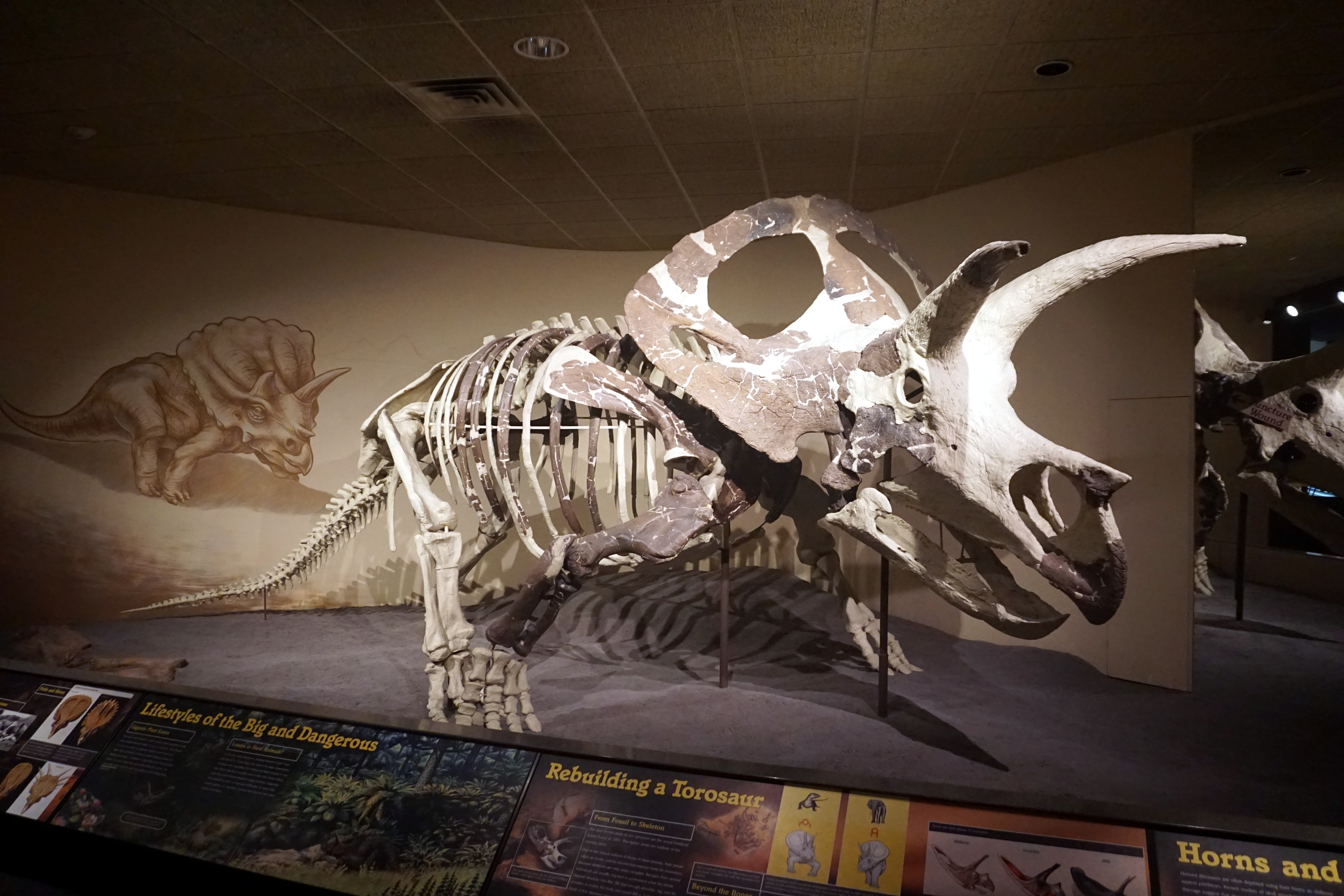
- Mounted fossilized skeleton of the Late Cretaceous horned dinosaur Torosaurus
  †Torosaurus
  - †Torosaurus utahensis – or unidentified comparable form
- †Toucasia
  - †Toucasia hancockensis
  - †Toucasia texana
- †Tovula
  - †Tovula microlirae
- †Trachybaculites
  - †Trachybaculites columna
- Trachycardium
  - †Trachycardium eufaulensis
  - †Trachycardium tinninense
- †Trachyscaphites
  - †Trachyscaphites densicostatus – type locality for species
  - †Trachyscaphites porchi
  - †Trachyscaphites spiniger
- †Trigonarca – tentative report
- †Trigonia
  - †Trigonia clavigera
  - †Trigonia emoryi
  - †Trigonia goodellii
  - †Trigonia munita
  - †Trigonia proscabra
  - †Trigonia stantoni
  - †Trigonia vyschetzkii
- †Trilophosaurus – type locality for genus
  - †Trilophosaurus buettneri – type locality for species
  - †Trilophosaurus jacobsi
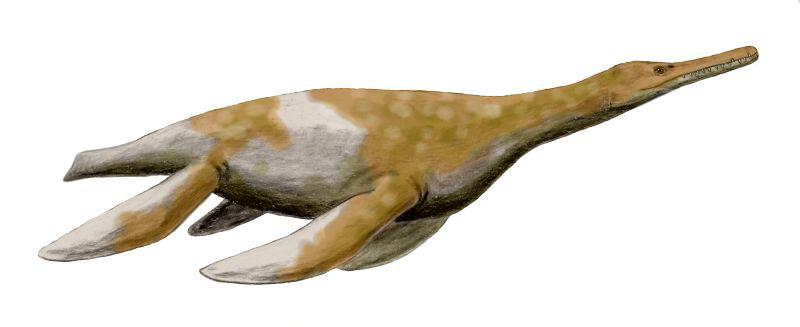
- Life restoration of the Late Cretaceous plesiosaur Trinacromerum
  †Trinacromerum – type locality for genus
  - †Trinacromerum bentonianum – type locality for species
- †Trinitichelys – type locality for genus
  - †Trinitichelys hiatti – type locality for species
- †Triodus
  - †Triodus moorei
- †Triopticus – type locality for genus
  - †Triopticus primus – type locality for species
- †Tristix
  - †Tristix gigantea
  - †Tristix quadrata
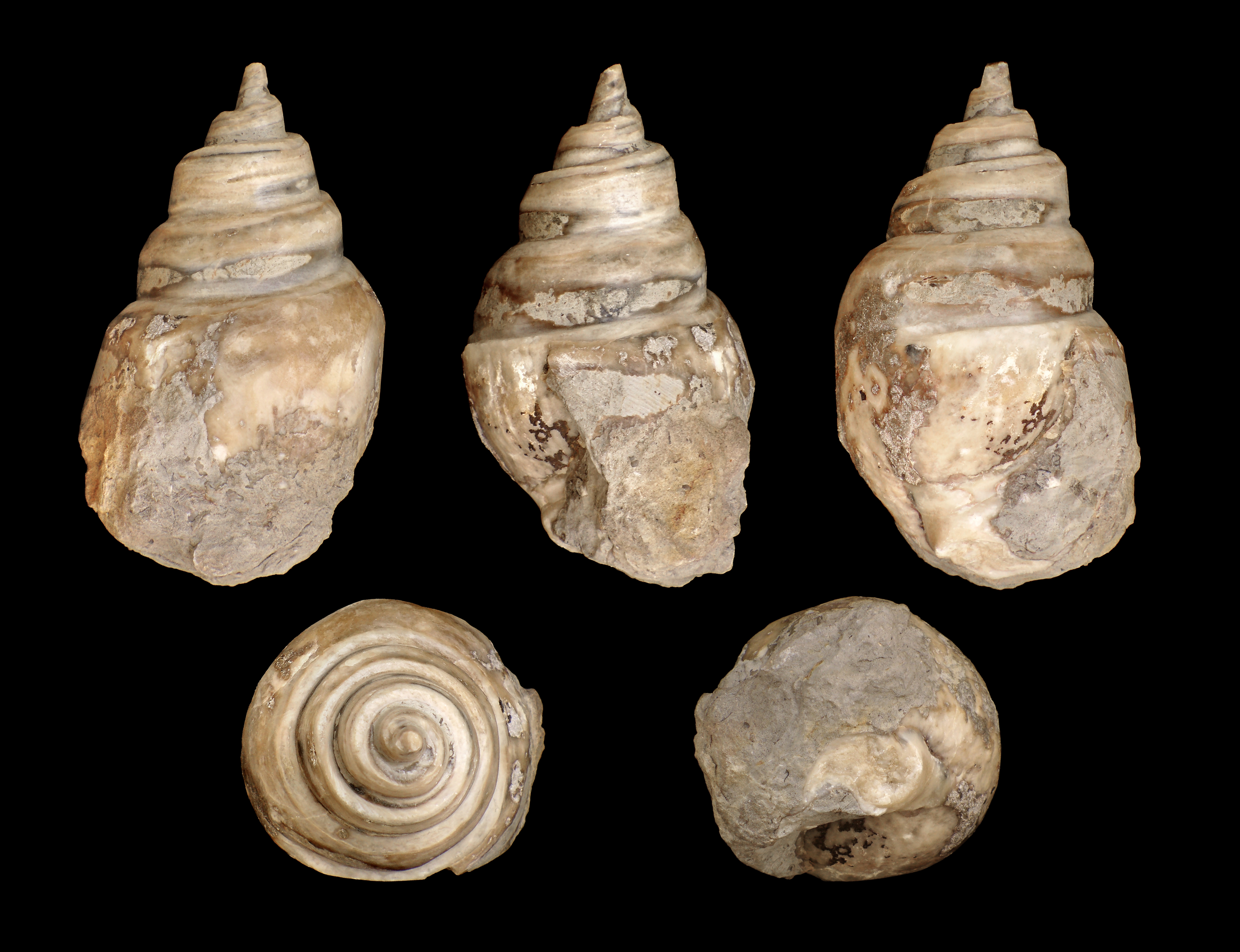
- Fossilized shell in multiple views of the Early-Late Cretaceous sea snail Trochactaeon
  †Trochactaeon
  - †Trochactaeon cumminsi
- Trochocyathus
  - †Trochocyathus gardnerae – type locality for species
  - †Trochocyathus scottianus – type locality for species
  - †Trochocyathus sellardsi – type locality for species
  - †Trochocyathus taylorensis – type locality for species
  - †Trochocyathus wintoni – type locality for species
  - †Trochocyathus woolmani
- †Trochoseris
  - †Trochoseris shattucki – type locality for species
- †Trochosmilia
  - †Trochosmilia stainbrooki – type locality for species
- †Troostella
  - †Troostella brevispira
  - †Troostella sublinearis
- Tryonia
  - †Tryonia valida
- †Tundora
  - †Tundora tuberculata
- Turboella
  - †Turboella crebricostata
  - †Turboella tallahatchiensis
- †Turgidodon
  - †Turgidodon lillegraveni – or unidentified comparable form
- †Turrilites
  - †Turrilites acutus
  - †Turrilites saudersorum
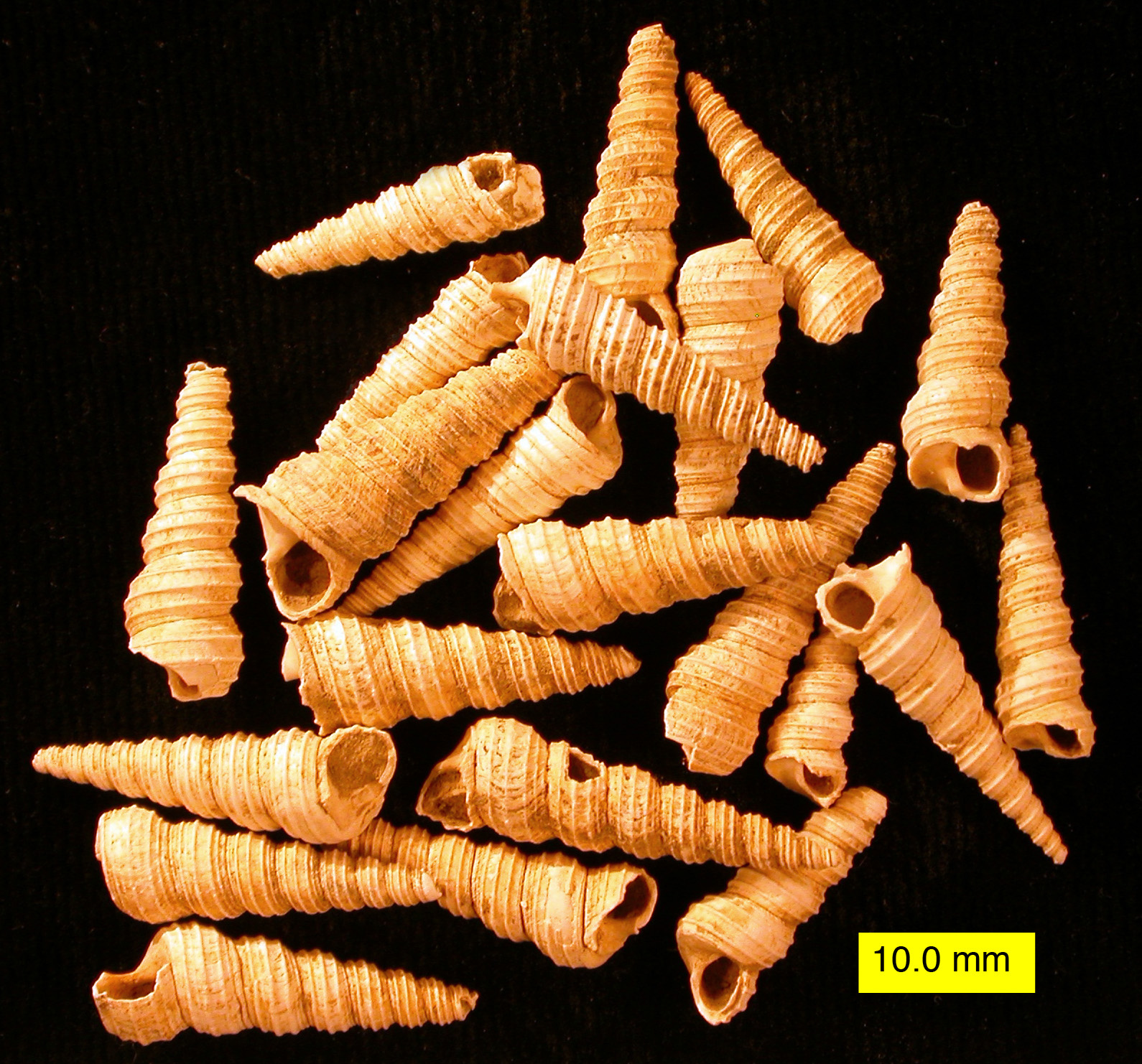
- Fossilized shells of the Late Jurassic-modern tower snail Turritella
  Turritella
  - †Turritella anstini
  - †Turritella bilira
  - †Turritella delriensis
  - †Turritella forgemoli – or unidentified comparable form
  - †Turritella hilgardi
  - †Turritella houstonia
  - †Turritella macnairyensis
  - †Turritella marnochi
  - †Turritella paravertebroides
  - †Turritella quadrilira
  - †Turritella seriatimgranulata
  - †Turritella shuleri
  - †Turritella trilira
  - †Turritella vertebroides
  - †Turritella vertebroides jonesi
  - †Turritella winchelli
- †Turseodus – tentative report
- †Tylosaurus
  - †Tylosaurus kansasensis
  - †Tylosaurus nepaeolicus
  - †Tylosaurus proriger – or unidentified comparable form
- †Typothorax
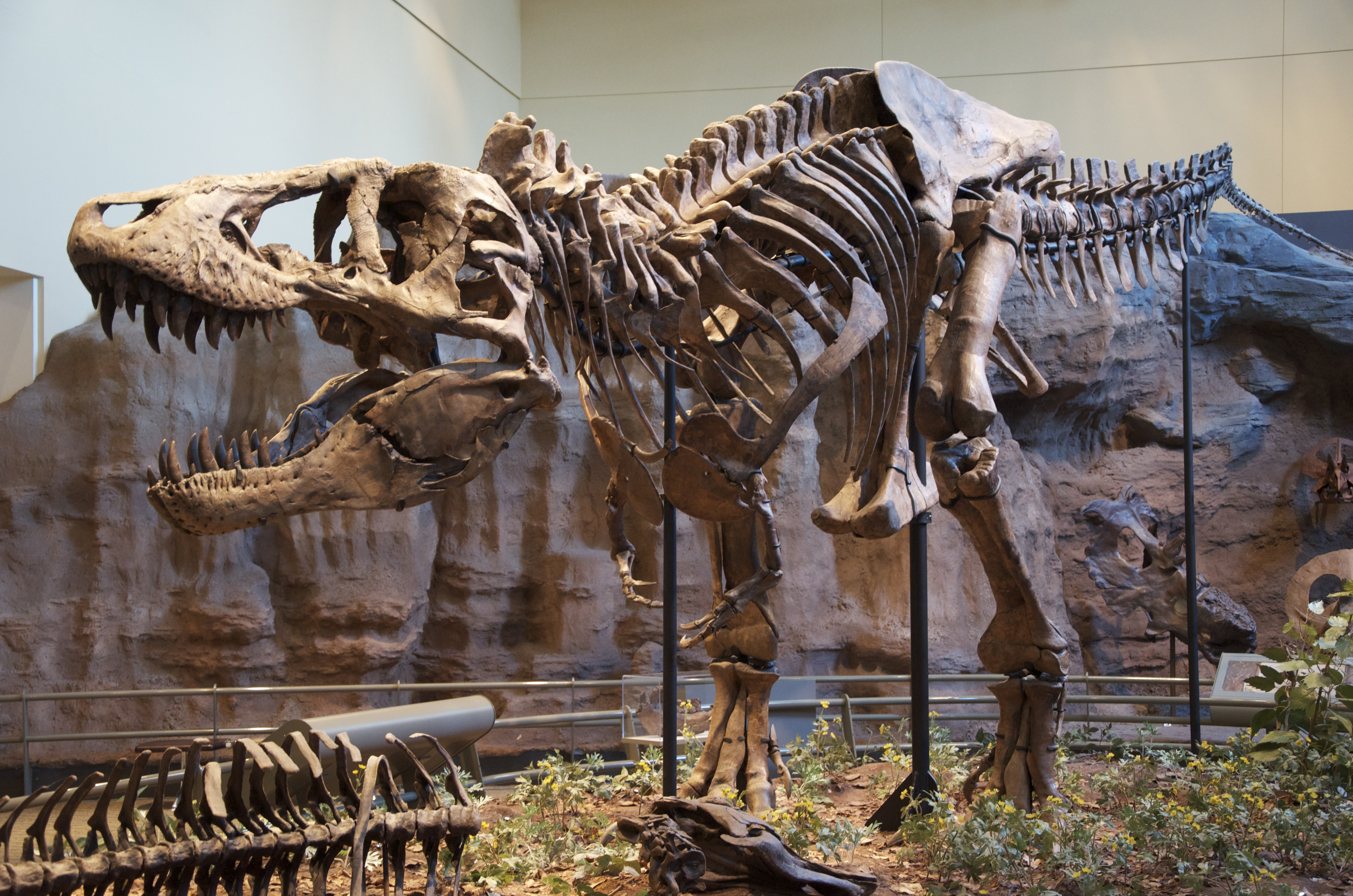
- Fossilized skeleton of the Late Cretaceous tyrannosaur Tyrannosaurus
  †Tyrannosaurus
  - †Tyrannosaurus rex

== U ==
- †Uddenia
- †Uktenadactylus
  - †Uktenadactylus wadleighi – type locality for species
- †Unicardium
  - †Unicardium concentricum
- Unio
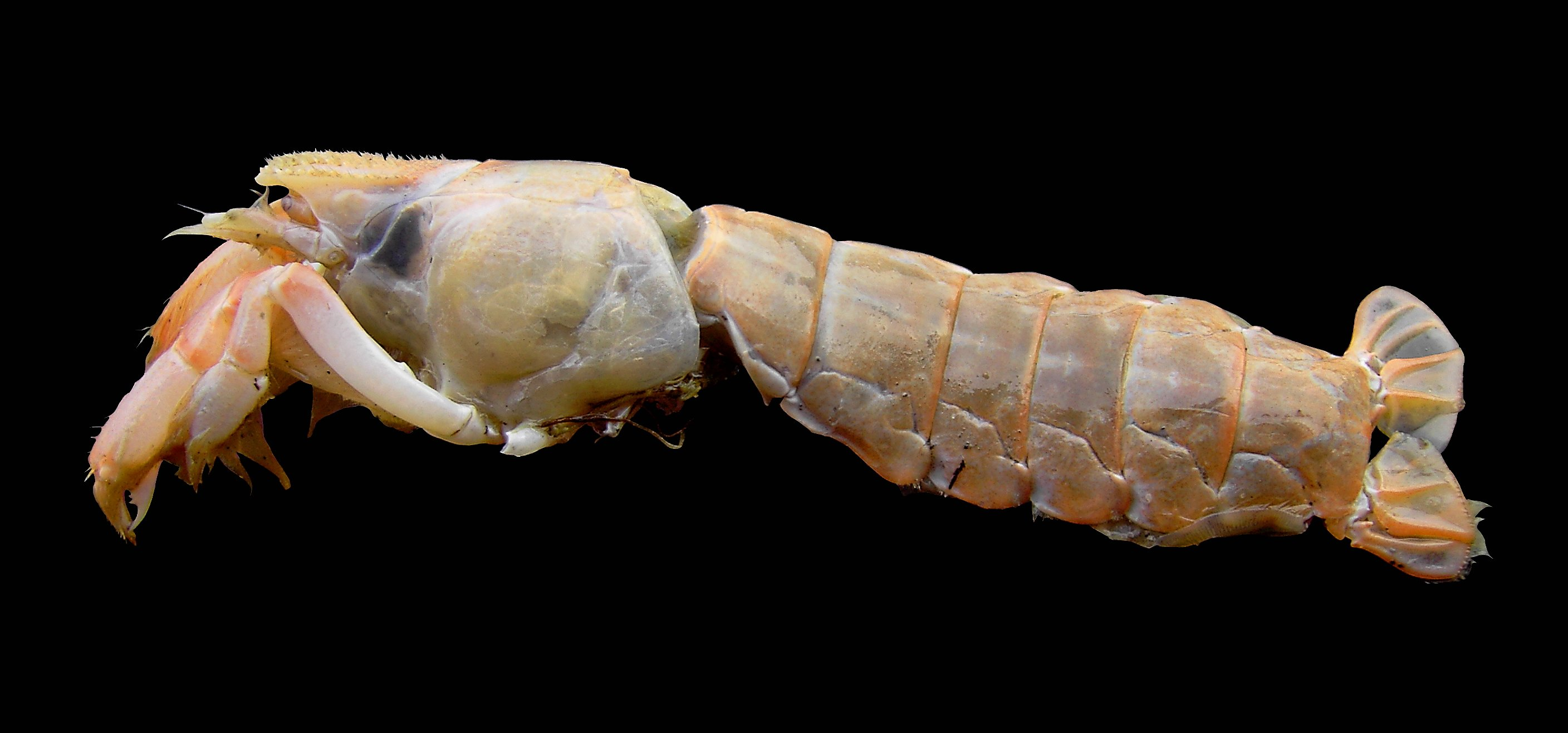
- A living Upogebia mud shrimp
  †Upogebia
  - †Upogebia rhacheochir
- †Urceolabrum
  - †Urceolabrum mantachieensis – tentative report
  - †Urceolabrum tuberculatum
- †Ursirivus
  - †Ursirivus arlingtonanus
  - †Ursirivus fannensis
  - †Ursirivus fanninensis

== V ==
- Vaginulina
- Valvulineria
  - †Valvulineria asterigerinoides
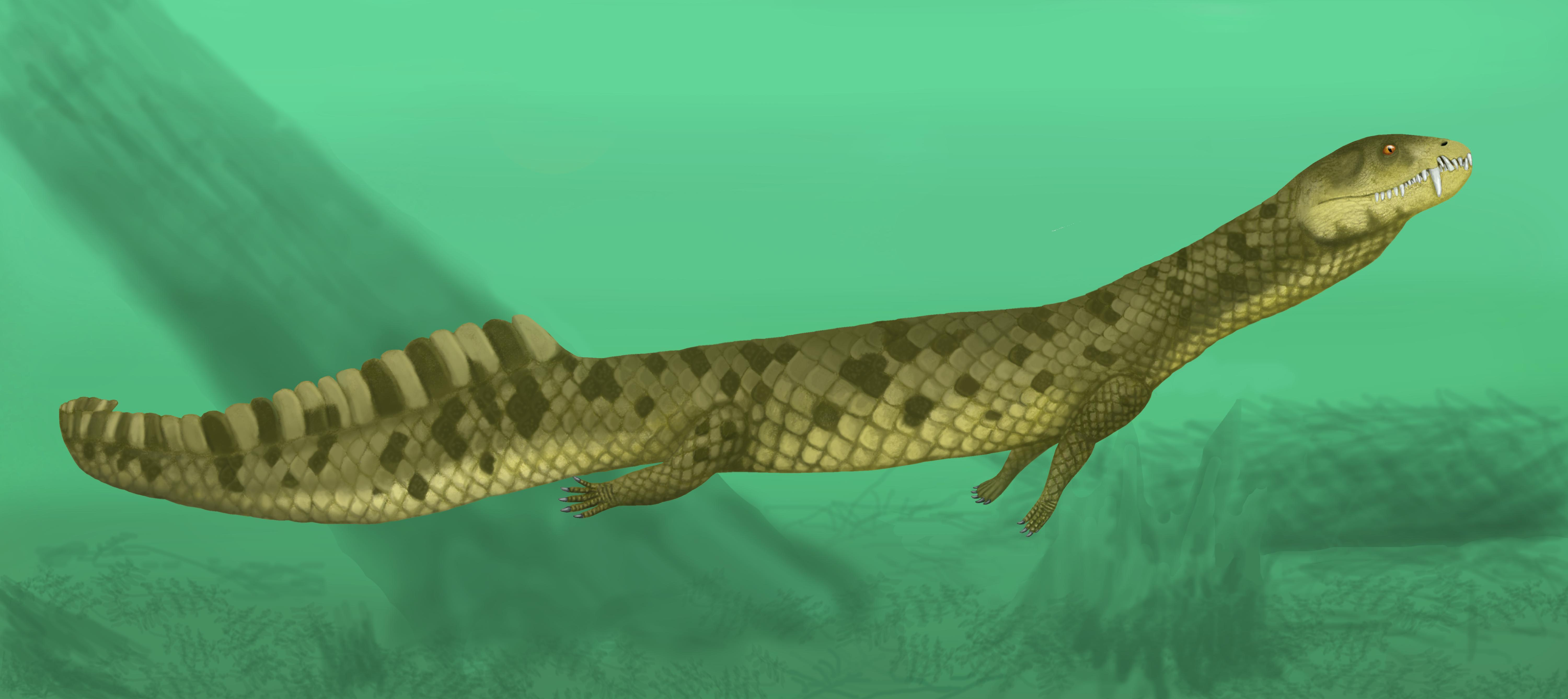
- Life restoration of the Late Triassic reptile Vancleavea
  †Vancleavea
  - †Vancleavea campi
- †Vascellum
  - †Vascellum elegans
  - †Vascellum fortispirae
  - †Vascellum leve
  - †Vascellum magnum
  - †Vascellum minusculum
  - †Vascellum mundum
  - †Vascellum mundum subteres
  - †Vascellum pingue
  - †Vascellum procerum
  - †Vascellum rivanum
  - †Vascellum robustum
  - †Vascellum subleve
  - †Vascellum tensum
  - †Vascellum vascellum
  - †Vascellum vascellum pressulum
  - †Vascellum vascellum subornatum
  - †Vascellum vianum
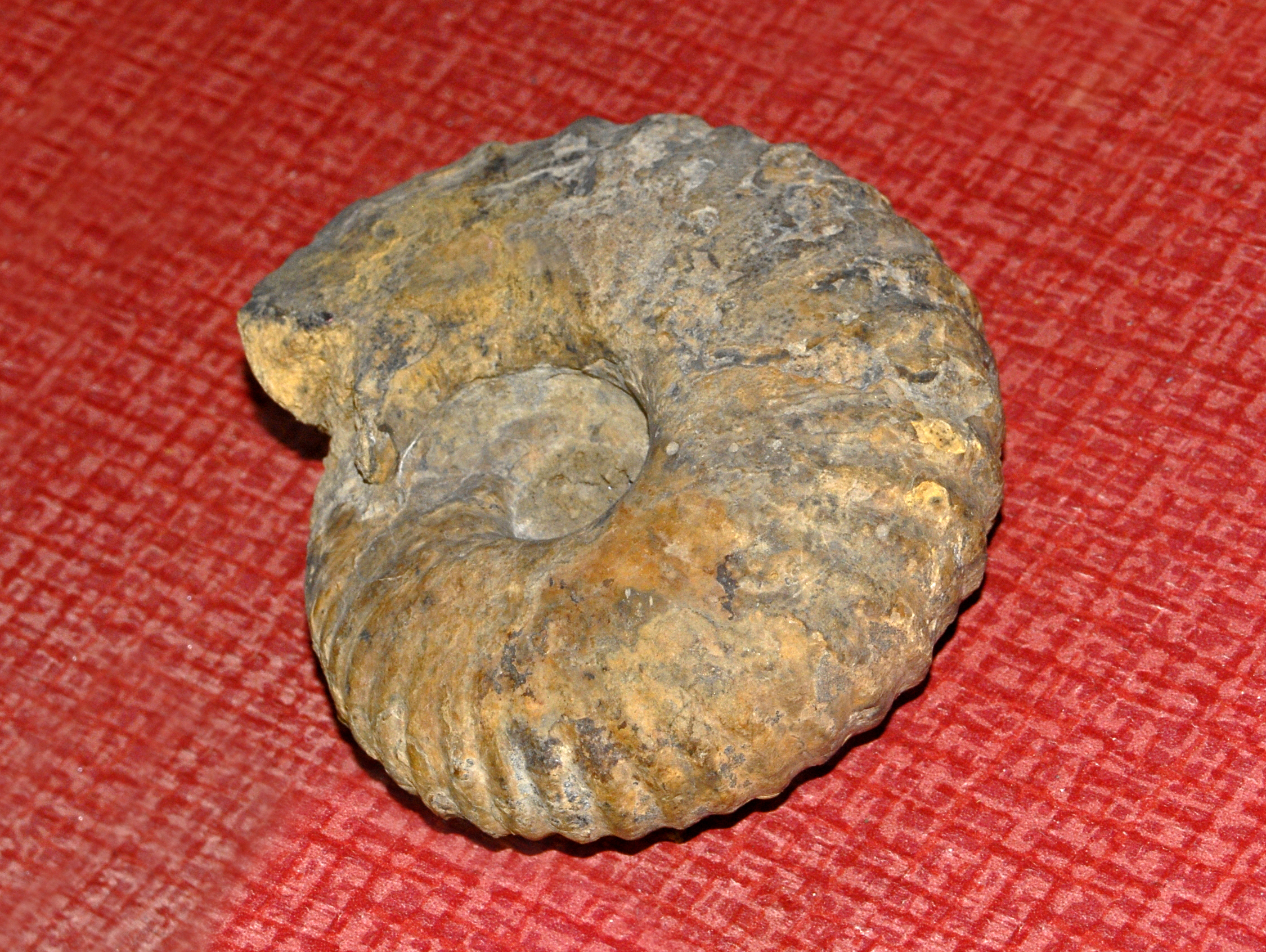
- Fossilized shell of the Late Cretaceous ammonoid cephalopod Vascoceras
  †Vascoceras
  - †Vascoceras cauvini – or unidentified comparable form
  - †Vascoceras proprium
  - †Vascoceras silvanense
- Venericardia
  - †Venericardia uvaldana
- †Veniella
  - †Veniella conradi
  - †Veniella lineata
- †Vetericardiella
  - †Vetericardiella crenalirata
  - †Vetericardiella webbervillensis
- †Vicarya
- †Vinella
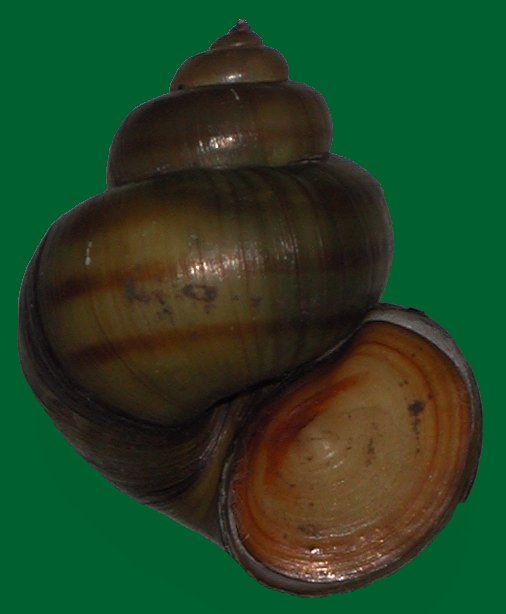
- Shell of a Viviparus freshwater snail
  Viviparus – tentative report
- Volsella
  - †Volsella alveolana
  - †Volsella modesta
  - †Volsella tarrantana
  - †Volsella uddeni
- †Volutomorpha
  - †Volutomorpha aspera
  - †Volutomorpha conradi
  - †Volutomorpha graysonensis
  - †Volutomorpha retifera
- †Voysa
  - †Voysa compacta
  - †Voysa constricta
  - †Voysa eulessana
  - †Voysa lepida
  - †Voysa minor
  - †Voysa planolata
  - †Voysa savoiana
  - †Voysa speciosa
  - †Voysa varia
  - †Voysa varia extensa
  - †Voysa varia levicostae
  - †Voysa varia nodosa
- Vulsella
  - †Vulsella alveolana
  - †Vulsella tarrantana

== W ==
- †Wadeopsammia
  - †Wadeopsammia nodosa
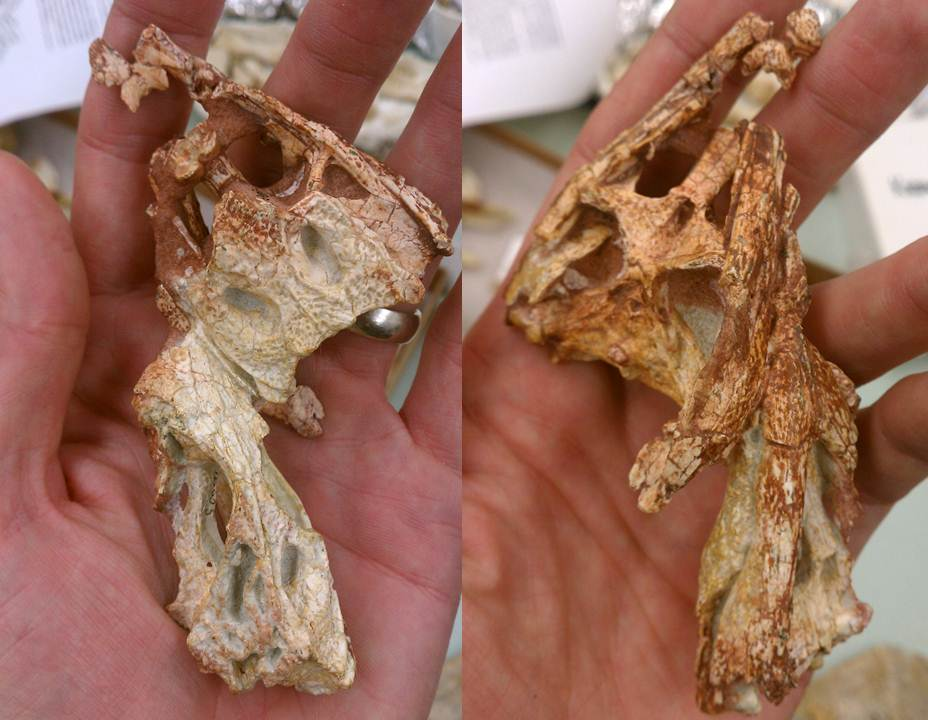
- Fossilized partial skulls of the Early Cretaceous crocodilian Wannchampsus
  †Wannchampsus – type locality for genus
  - †Wannchampsus kirpachi – type locality for species
- †Wannia
  - †Wannia scurriensis – type locality for species
- †Washitaster
  - †Washitaster longisulcus
- †Weeksia
  - †Weeksia lubbocki
- †Woodbinax
  - †Woodbinax texanus
- †Woodbinesuchus – type locality for genus
  - †Woodbinesuchus byersmauricei – type locality for species
- †Worthoceras
  - †Worthoceras gibbosum
  - †Worthoceras vermiculum – or unidentified comparable form
- †Wrightoceras
  - †Wrightoceras munieri

== X ==
- Xanthosia
  - †Xanthosia pawpawensis
  - †Xanthosia reidi
  - †Xanthosia wintoni
- †Xenacanthus – report made of unidentified related form or using admittedly obsolete nomenclature
- Xenophora
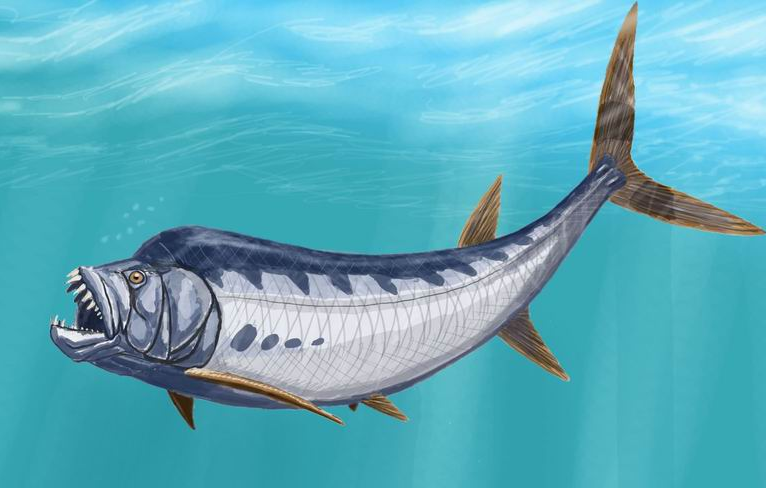
- Life restoration of the Cretaceous bony fish Xiphactinus
  †Xiphactinus
- †Xylophagella
  - †Xylophagella whitneyi

== Y ==
- †Yezoites
  - †Yezoites subevolutus
- Yoldia
  - †Yoldia septariana
  - †Yoldia subacuta
