= Calcare di Zorzino =

Geological formation in Italy

- Stratigraphic range: Norian (Alaunian); ~216.6–212 Ma
- Type: Geological formation
- Underlies: Argilliti di Riva di Solta
- Overlies: Dolomia Principale

Lithology
- Primary: Limestone
- Other: Marl

Location
- Coordinates: 45.8°N 9.8°E
- Approximate paleocoordinates: 27.1°N 13.8°E
- Region: Lombardy
- Country: Italy

Type section
- Named for: Zorzino
- Calcare di Zorzino (Italy)

The Calcare di Zorzino, Italian for Zorzino Limestone is a Late Triassic (Norian) geological formation in Italy (Cene and Endenna). Pterosaurs, drepanosaurs, and other reptiles have been recovered in this formation.

== Paleobiota ==
Pterosaurs of the Zorzino Limestone
Taxa	Locality	Notes	Images
Eudimorphodon ranzi	Cene		
Peteinosaurus zambellii	Cene		
?Preondactylus?	Endenna	Possible Preondactylus remains of an indeterminate species	
Bergamodactylus			

=== Other reptiles ===
- Aetosaurus ferratus
- Drepanosaurus unguicaudatus
- Endennasaurus acutirostris
- Langobardisaurus pandolfii
- Megalancosaurus endennae
- M. preonensis
- Mystriosuchus planirostris
- Psephoderma alpinum
- Vallesaurus cenensis
- V. zorzinensis
- Diphydontosaurus sp.
- ?Mystriosuchus sp.
- ?Theropoda indet.

=== Fish ===
- Brembodus ridens
- Dandya ovalis
- Dapedium noricum
- Gabanellia agilis
- Gibbodon cenensis
- Italopterus magnificus
- Legnonotus krambergeri
- Parapholidophorus nybelini
- Pholidoctenus serianus
- Pholidorhynchodon malzannii
- Pseudodalatias barnstonensis
- Sargodon tomicus
