= Pholidophoropsis =

Scientific classification
- Kingdom: Animalia
- Phylum: Chordata
- Class: Actinopterygii
- Order: †Pholidophoriformes
- Family: †Pholidophoridae
- Genus: †Pholidophoropsis; Nybelin, 1966

Extinct genus of fishes

Pholidophoropsis is an extinct genus of prehistoric ray-finned fish.

== See also ==
- Prehistoric fish
- List of prehistoric bony fish
