= Hungkiichthys =

Hungkiichthys Temporal range: Middle Jurassic

Scientific classification
- Kingdom: Animalia
- Phylum: Chordata
- Class: Actinopterygii
- Order: †Pholidophoriformes
- Genus: †Hungkiichthys; Liu & Wang, 1961
- Species: †H. anni

Binomial name
- †Hungkiichthys anni Liu & Wang, 1961

Extinct genus of fishes

Hungkiichthys is an extinct genus of prehistoric ray-finned fish that lived in Asia during the Jurassic period. It contains a single species, H. anni from the Middle Jurassic of Xinjiang, China. It is considered a "pholidophorid" under a sensu lato interpretation of the family, but its taxonomic affiliations remain uncertain.
