= Eomesodon =

Eomesodon Temporal range: Early Jurassic

Scientific classification
- Kingdom: Animalia
- Phylum: Chordata
- Class: Actinopterygii
- Order: †Pycnodontiformes
- Family: †Brembodontidae
- Genus: †Eomesodon; Woodward, 1918
- Species: †E. liassicus

Binomial name
- †Eomesodon liassicus (Egerton, 1854)

Extinct genus of fishes

Eomesodon (Greek for "dawn Mesodon", Mesodon being a now-disused pycnodont genus) is an extinct genus of prehistoric marine pycnodont fish.

It contains only a single definitive species, E. liassicus (Egerton, 1854) from the Early Jurassic (Hettangian to Sinemurian) of England (Lower Lias), France, and Belgium (Marnes de Jamoigne Formation). The specimen from England is known from a nearly complete skeleton. E. liassicus is the only known species of pycnodont known from the earliest Jurassic Europe following the Triassic-Jurassic extinction event, and the group does not see further diversification in Europe until the Toarcian.

In addition to E. liassicus, several other species from the Late Triassic to the earliest Cretaceous were placed in this genus. However, a 2026 study found most of these individuals to belong to the genus Apomesodon. "E." hoeferi (Gorjanovic-Kramberger, 1905) from the Triassic was found to likely represent a distinct undescribed genus within the same family.

The following species were formerly placed in this genus:

- "E." barnesi (Woodward, 1906) → Apomesodon damoni (Woodward, 1890)
- "E." depressus Woodward, 1916 → Apomesodon sp.
- "E." granulatus (Münster, 1846) → Apomesodon granulatus (Münster, 1846)
- "E." rugulosus (Agassiz, 1839) → Apomesodon sp.

Some studies have found it to be potentially related to the Triassic genus Brembodus, while others have found it to be more basal. A 2026 study found strong evidence for the genus belonging to the Brembodontidae.

== See also ==
- Prehistoric fish
- List of prehistoric bony fish
