= Dandya =

Dandya is a scientific name for two genera of organisms and may refer to:

- A genus of prehistoric fishes in the extinct fish family Semionotidae with one species, Dandya ovalis
- A genus of plants in the asparagus family Asparagaceae with one species, Dandya purpusii
