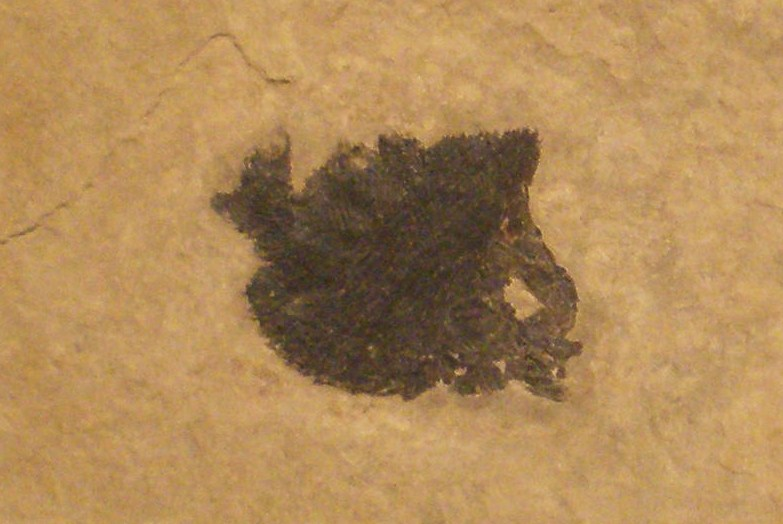
- Specimen at Museo Caffi di Bergamo

Scientific classification
- Kingdom: Animalia
- Phylum: Chordata
- Class: Actinopterygii
- Order: †Pycnodontiformes
- Family: †Brembodontidae
- Genus: †Gibbodon; Tintori, 1981
- Species: †G. cenensis

Binomial name
- †Gibbodon cenensis Tintori, 1981

= Gibbodon =

Gibbodon Temporal range: Late Triassic (Norian)

Extinct genus of fishes

Gibbodon is an extinct genus of marine pycnodontid ray-finned fish from the Late Triassic of Europe. It contains a single species, G. cenensis from the Norian-aged Zorzino Limestone of Cene, Italy. It was previously placed in its own family Gibbodontidae, but is now known to belong in the family Brembodontidae.

It lived sympatrically with its close relative, Brembodus.

== See also ==
- Pycnodontiformes
- Prehistoric fish
- List of prehistoric bony fish
