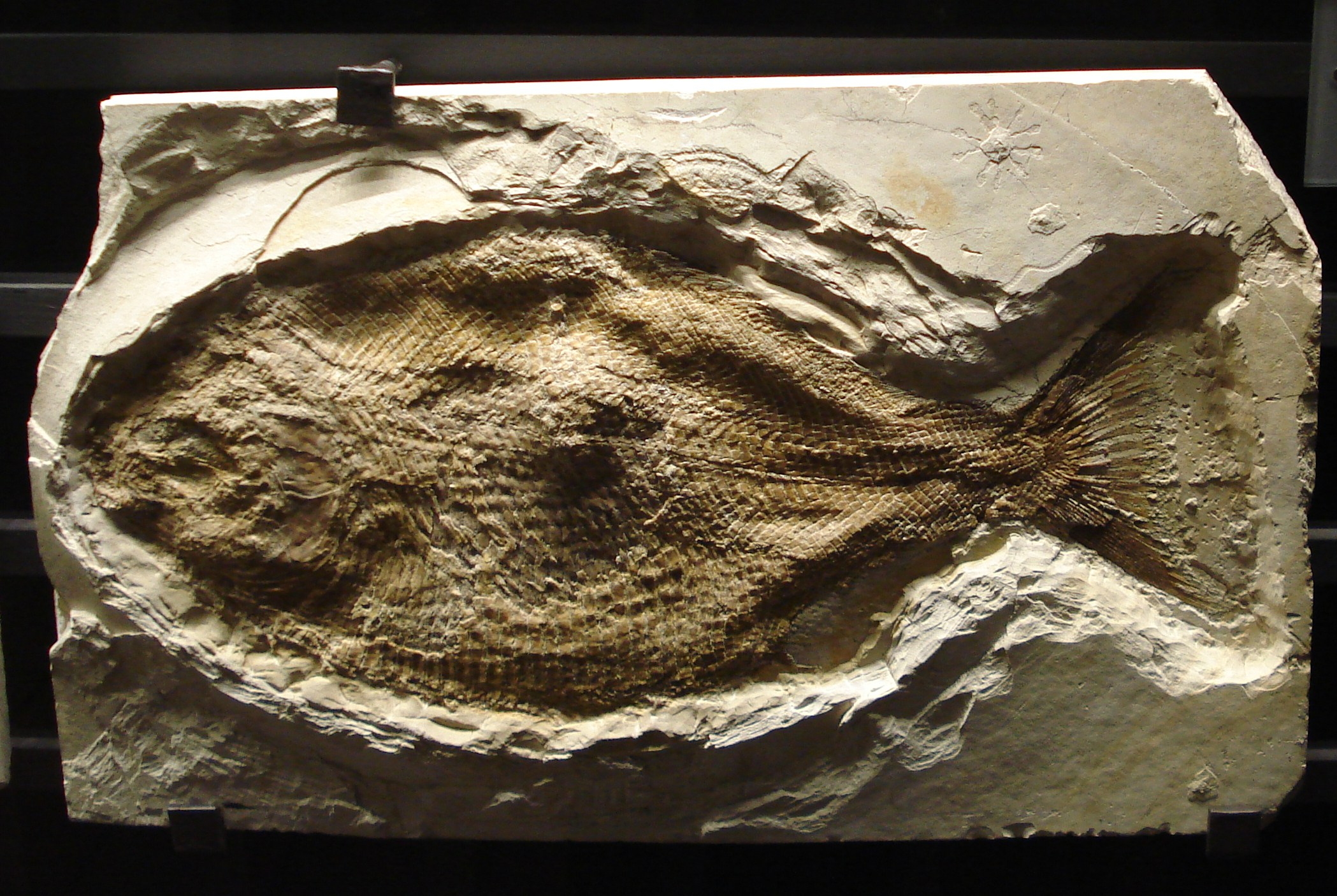
- Specimen of H. latus, Jura Museum

Scientific classification
- Kingdom: Animalia
- Phylum: Chordata
- Class: Actinopterygii
- Family: †Dapediidae
- Genus: †Heterostrophus; Wagner, 1863

Species
- †Heterostrophus latus Wagner, 1863 (Type); †Heterostrophus phillipsi Woodward, 1928

= Heterostrophus =

Heterostrophus Temporal range: Callovian- Early Tithonian

Extinct genus of ray-finned fishes

Heterostrophus is an extinct genus of marine ray-finned fish belonging to the family Dapediidae. It is known from the Jurassic of Europe, where it lived from the Middle to Late Jurassic epochs. It was one of the last known members of its long-surviving family.

The following species are known:

- H. latus Wagner, 1863 - Late Jurassic (Tithonian) of Germany (Solnhofen Formation)
- H. phillipsi Woodward, 1929 - Middle Jurassic (Callovian) of England (Oxford Clay)

Indeterminate remains are also known from the earlier Callovian-aged Kellaways Formation of England.

It is likely the sister genus to Dapedium, from which it differs in scale morphology.
