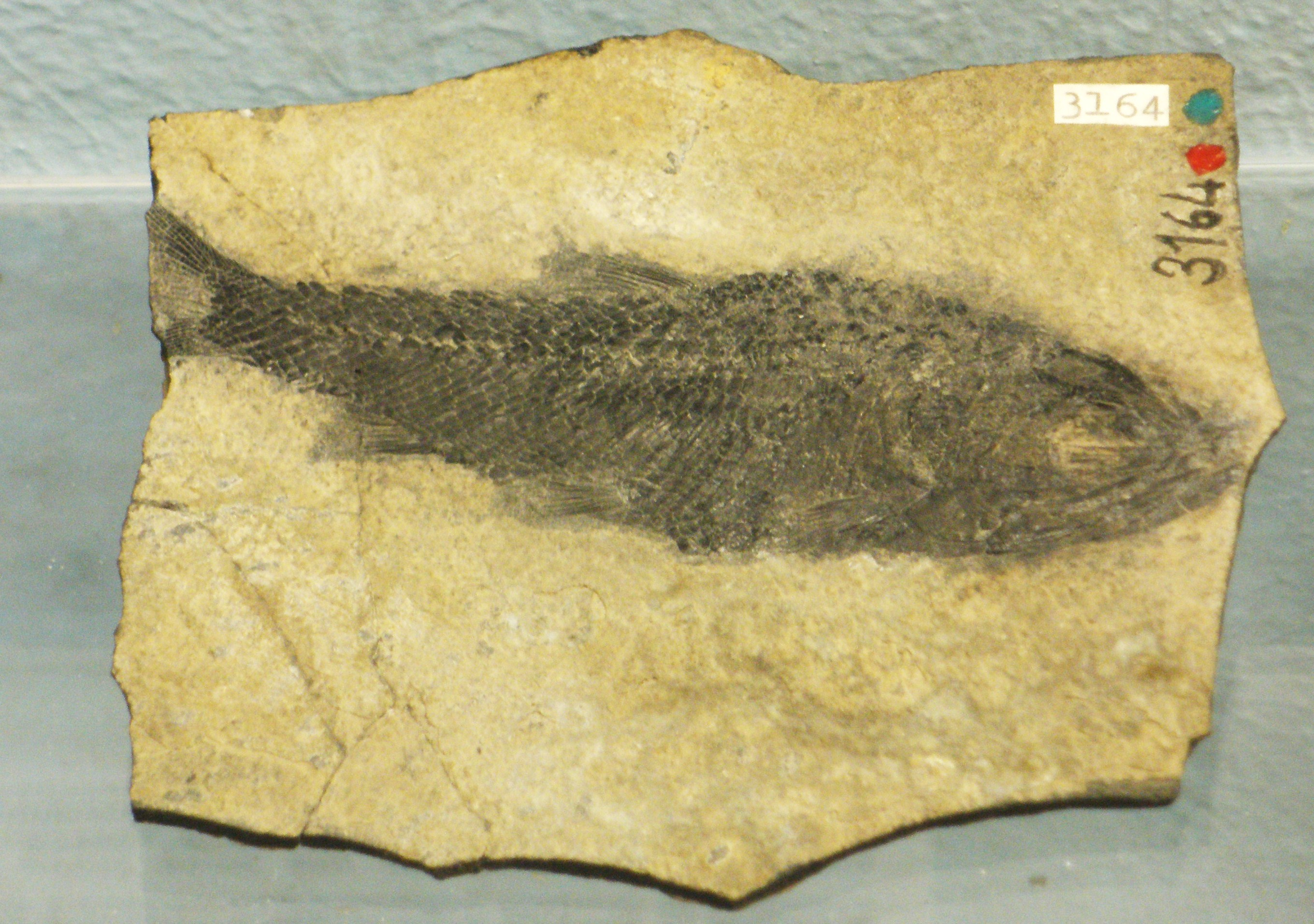
- Fossil

Scientific classification
- Kingdom: Animalia
- Phylum: Chordata
- Class: Actinopterygii
- Order: †Pholidophoriformes
- Family: †Pholidophoridae
- Genus: †Pholidorhynchodon; Zambelli, 1980

Type species
- †Pholidorhynchodon malzannii Zambelli, 1980

= Pholidorhynchodon =

Extinct genus of fishes

Pholidorhynchodon is an extinct genus of ray-finned fish that lived in the Triassic. Its fossils have been found in Italy, in the Zorzino Limestone Formation in Cene.

== Significance ==
Pholidorhynchodon belongs to a group of fish that are right at the very base of the teleosts. Teleost fish include almost all living fish species, and have their origins in the Triassic. This makes Pholidorhynchodon important because it provides information about the early evolution and development of this important group.

== See also ==
- Prehistoric fish
- List of prehistoric bony fish
