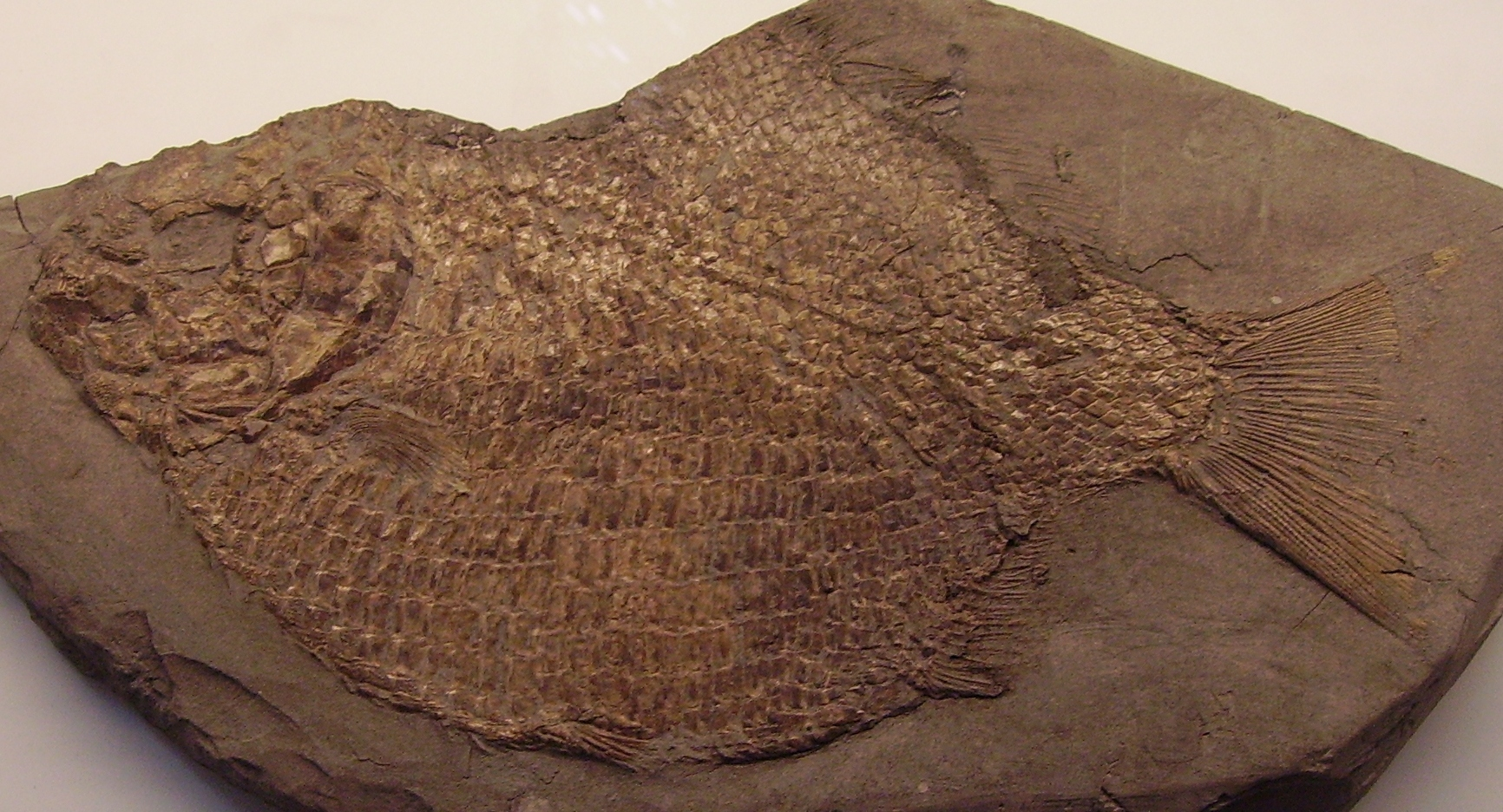
- Fossil specimen of Dapedium politum
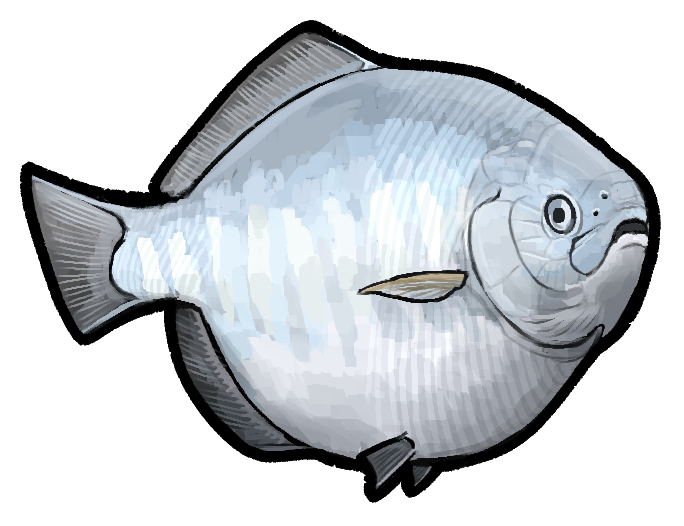
- Artist's reconstruction of Dapedium politum

Scientific classification
- Kingdom: Animalia
- Phylum: Chordata
- Class: Actinopterygii
- Infraclass: Holostei
- Family: †Dapediidae; Lehman, 1966

Genera
- †Aetheolepis; †Ameghinichthys; †Dandya; †Dapedium; †Guizhoubrachysomus; †Hemicalypterus; †Heterostrophus; †Paradapedium; †Sargodon; †Scopulipiscis; †Tetragonolepis

= Dapediidae =

Dapediidae Temporal range: Ladinian–Tithonian

Extinct family of ray-finned fishes

Dapediidae is an extinct family of holostean ray-finned fish, that lived from the Middle Triassic to the Late Jurassic (Ladinian to Tithonian). They are noted for their relatively deep bodies and are thought to have been primarily durophagous.

== Description and ecology ==
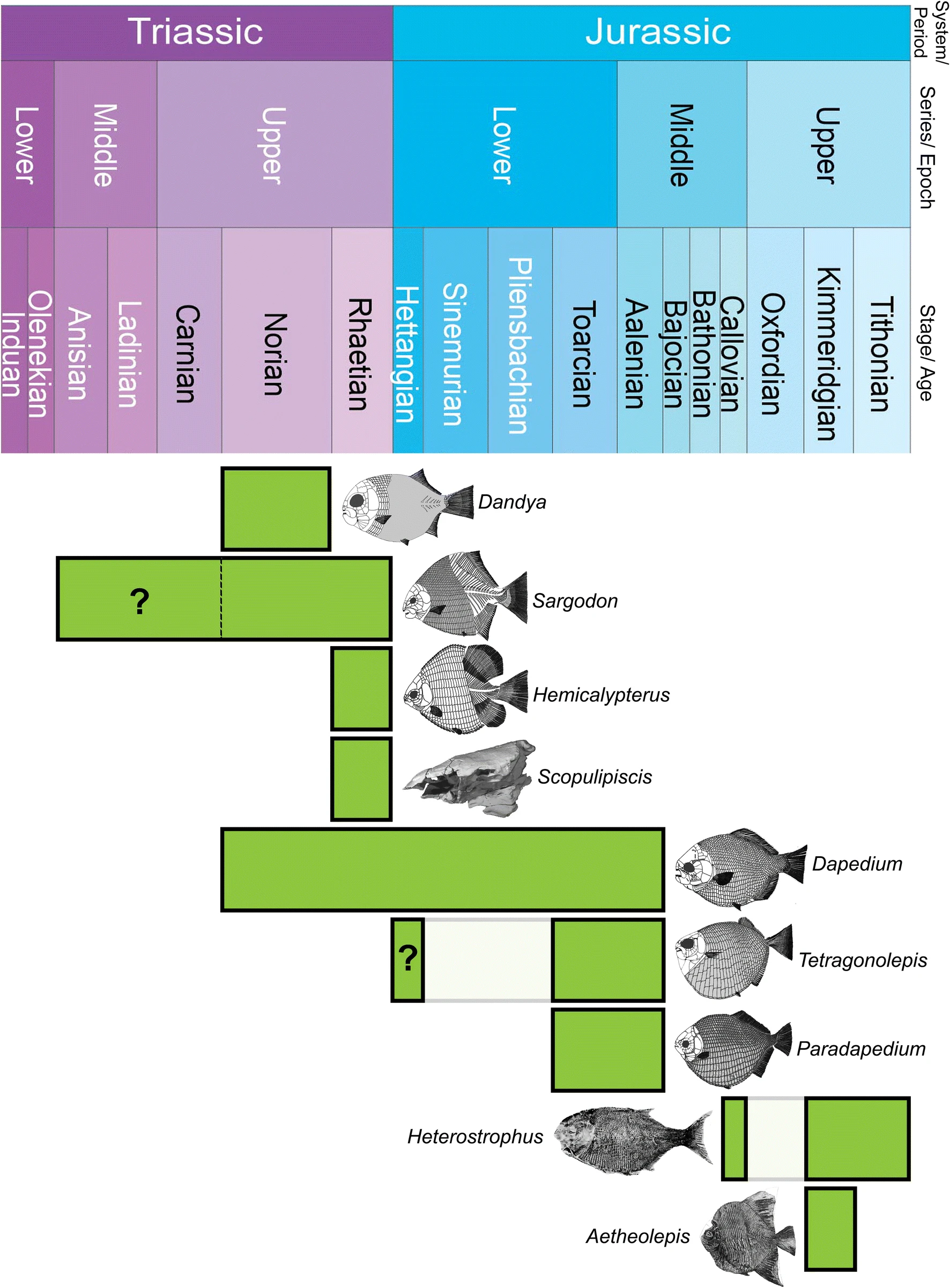
Morphological diversity and chronology of a number of dapediid genera

Dapediids had deep, laterally flattened circular bodies covered in thick ganoid scales, which gave them a resemblance to the pycnodontiforms, a group they may or may not be related to. Their teeth were adapted towards a durophagous diet; some dapediids fed on hard-shelled invertebrates such as ammonites and bivalves, though they may have also engaged in generalist scavenging. At least one genus and possibly some other genera (Hemicalypterus and possibly Dandya) may have been herbivorous.

== Classification ==
While universally agreed to be members of Neopterygii, their classification within this group has been subject to dispute, historically either being considered stem-teleosteomorphs or having affinities with Holostei (bowfins, gars and their extinct relatives). Studies from the end of the 2010s onwards have tended to support holostean affinities for the group. Their precise position within the group is disputed. Dapediids are often considered to be early diverging ginglymodians or more closely related to Ginglymodi (which contains the gars and their extinct relatives) than to Halecomorphi (which contains the bowfins and their extinct relatives). Some studies have resolved dapediids stem group representatives of the wider clade Holostei (making gars and bowfins more closely related to each other than to dapediids). A 2016 study suggested that Dapediidae should be placed in its own order, Dapediiformes. In 2025 the Ladinian Guizhoubrachysomus was identified as an early-diverging dapediid, and Dapediidae was recovered within the ginglymodian order Semionotiformes as the sister group of Macrosemiidae.
