= Pholidophoretes =

Pholidophoretes Temporal range: Carnian

Scientific classification
- Domain: Eukaryota
- Kingdom: Animalia
- Phylum: Chordata
- Class: Actinopterygii
- Order: †Pholidophoriformes
- Family: †Pholidophoridae
- Genus: †Pholidophoretes; Griffith, 1977
- Species: †P. salvus

Binomial name
- †Pholidophoretes salvus Griffith, 1977

Extinct genus of fishes

Pholidophoretes is an extinct genus of prehistoric ray-finned fish that lived during the Carnian stage of the Late Triassic epoch.

== See also ==
- Prehistoric fish
- List of prehistoric bony fish
