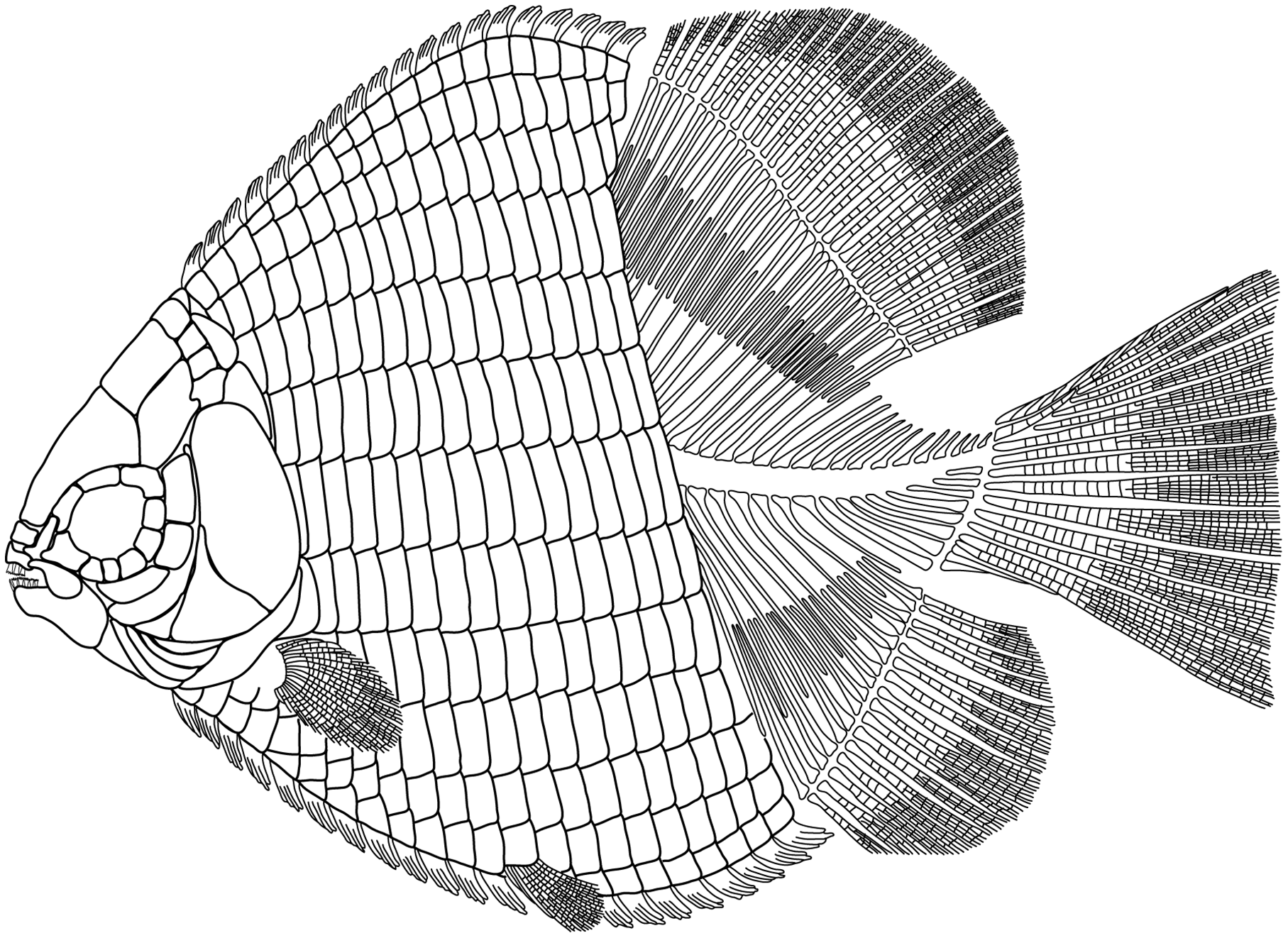
- Skeletal reconstruction

Scientific classification
- Kingdom: Animalia
- Phylum: Chordata
- Class: Actinopterygii
- Family: †Dapediidae
- Genus: †Hemicalypterus; Schaeffer, 1967
- Species: †H. weiri

Binomial name
- †Hemicalypterus weiri Schaeffer, 1967

= Hemicalypterus =

Hemicalypterus Temporal range: Late Triassic, ~221.4–201.4 Ma

Extinct genus of ray-finned fishes

Hemicalypterus is an extinct genus of prehistoric freshwater ray-finned fish that lived during the late Triassic period (approx. 221.4 to 205.6 Ma). It contains a single species, Hemicalypterus weiri. Fossils have been collected in the southwestern United States, including the Tecovas Formation of Texas, the Chinle Formation of Utah, and potentially New Mexico. Hemicalypterus belonged to the family Dapediidae, and like other members of its family, it was a deep-bodied fish with a covering of thick ganoid scales. It differed from other dapediids in lacking scales on the posterior part of the body, and in possessing unusual, multicuspid teeth. These teeth were similar to those of modern-day herbivorous fish, which indicates that Hemicalypterus may have been a herbivore as well.

== See also ==
- List of prehistoric bony fish genera
