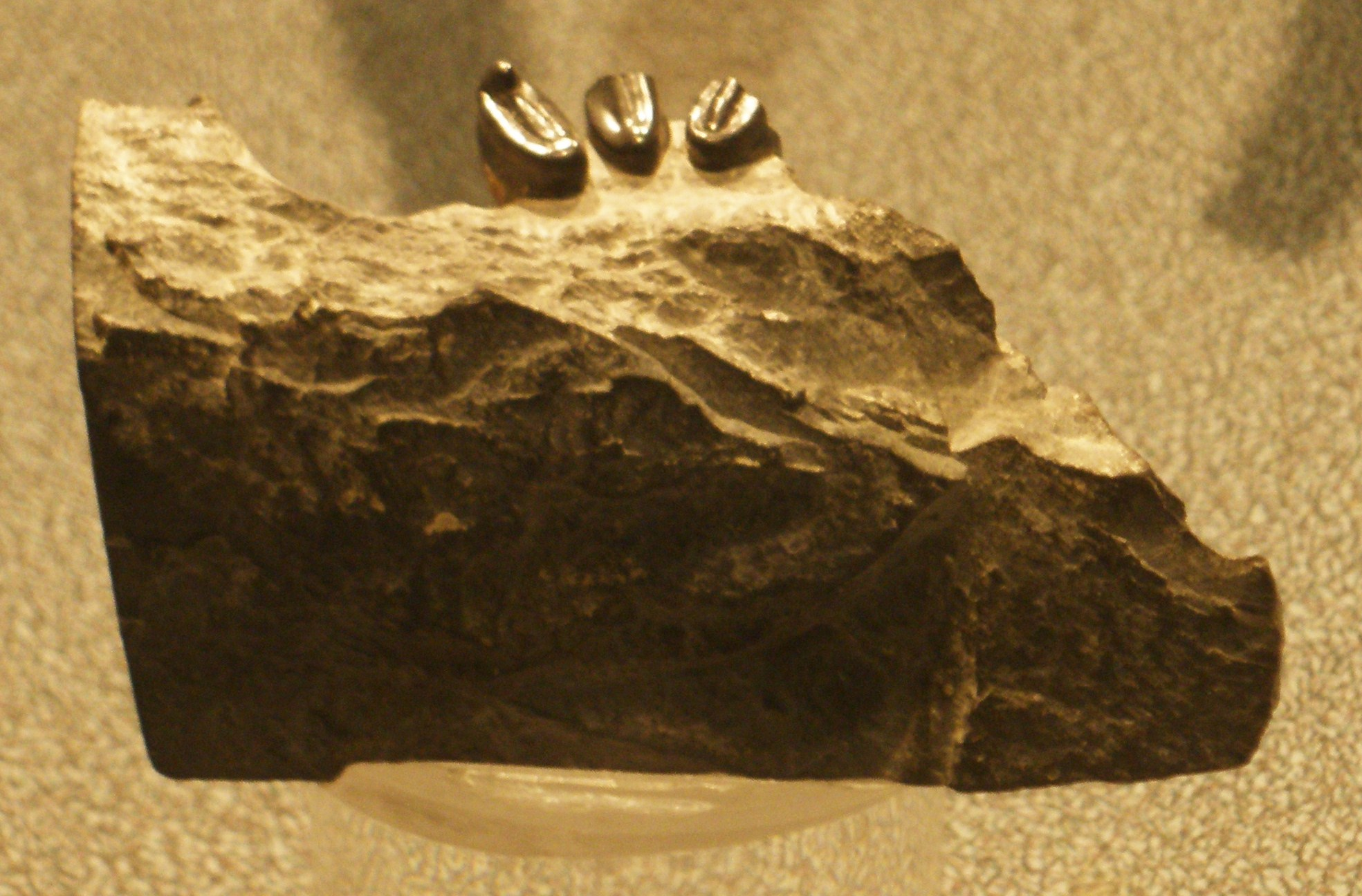
- Gornogomphodon caffii fossil teeth at the Museo di Scienze Naturali Enrico Caffi, Italy

Scientific classification
- Domain: Eukaryota
- Kingdom: Animalia
- Phylum: Chordata
- Clade: Synapsida
- Clade: Therapsida
- Clade: Cynodontia
- Clade: †Gomphodontia
- Genus: †Gornogomphodon; Renesto & Lucas, 2009
- Species: †G. caffii

Binomial name
- †Gornogomphodon caffii Renesto & Lucas, 2009

= Gornogomphodon =

Gornogomphodon Temporal range: Carnian ~228–217 Ma

Extinct genus of cynodonts

Gornogomphodon is an extinct genus of cynodonts from the Gorno Formation of Bergamo, Italy. It existed during the Middle Carnian age of the Late Triassic (around 216.5 to 228.0 million years ago). It contains only one species: Gornogomphodon caffi.

== Description ==
Gornogomphodon is known only from a fossil jaw fragment with three transversely elongate teeth preserved. The scant fossil material and the locality they were collected from (the Gorno Formation were once shallow lagoons) lead to initial uncertainty over the nature of the fossil. It was proposed to be the remains of a pycnodont fish but further studies eventually made this hypothesis unlikely. The overall morphology of the teeth suggests they are the upper postcanines of the right maxilla of a gomphodont (herbivorous cynodonts), but they also possess unique characteristics that make their taxonomic assignment difficult.

== Etymology ==
Gornogomphodon was named after the Gorno Formation (literally 'Gorno gomphodont'). The specific name for its only species Gornogomphodon caffi was named in honor of Enrico Caffi, the first director of the Museo di Scienze Naturali Enrico Caffi.
