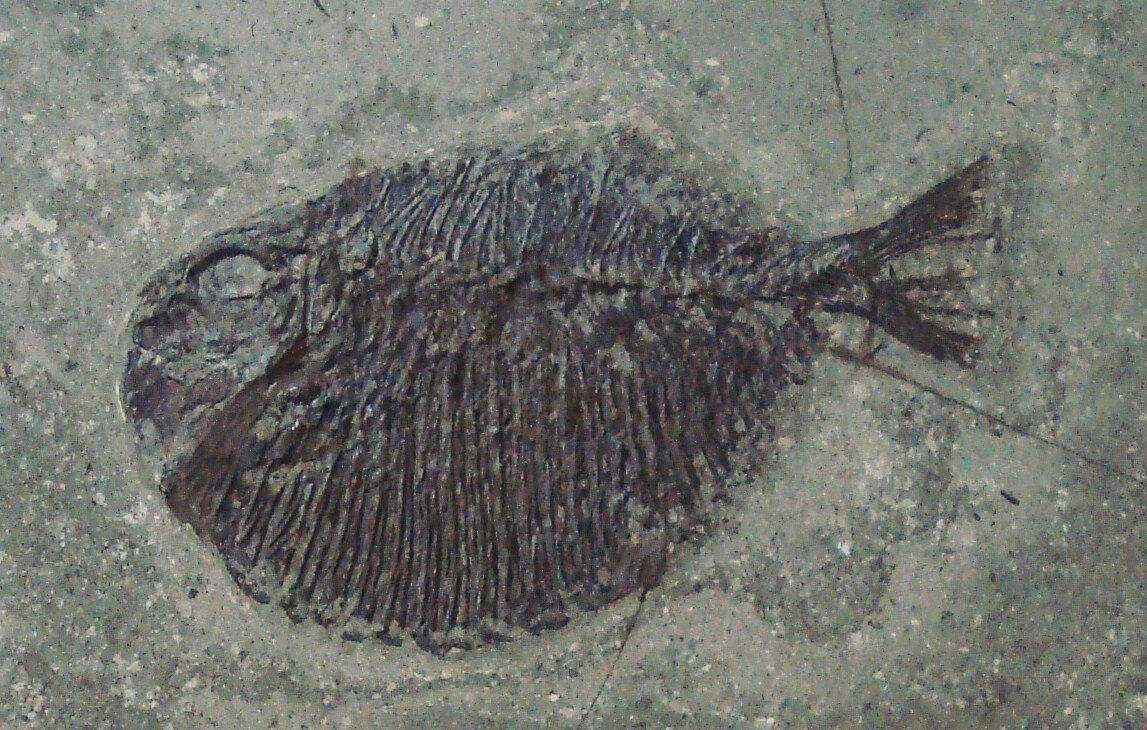
- Fossil

Scientific classification
- Kingdom: Animalia
- Phylum: Chordata
- Class: Actinopterygii
- Family: †Dapediidae
- Genus: †Tetragonolepis; Bronn, 1830

Species
- †Tetragonolepis discus; †Tetragonolepis semicincta

= Tetragonolepis =

Tetragonolepis Temporal range: 203.6–196.5 Ma Rhaetian to Middle Hettangian

Extinct genus of fishes

Tetragonolepis (from Greek: τετρα tetra, 'four', Greek: γονή gonḗ, 'angle', and Greek: λεπίς lepis 'scale') is an extinct genus of bony fish belonging to the family Dapediidae that lived during the Rhaetian–Hettangian ages (latest Triassic to earliest Jurassic).

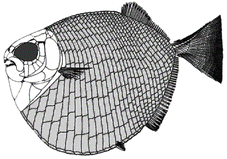
Reconstruction of T. semicincta

== Sources ==
- In the Shadow of the Dinosaurs: Early Mesozoic Tetrapods by Nicholas C. Fraser and Hans-Dieter Sues
