= Zambellichthys =

Zambellichthys Temporal range: Norian

Scientific classification
- Kingdom: Animalia
- Phylum: Chordata
- Class: Actinopterygii
- Order: †Pholidophoriformes
- Family: †Pholidophoridae
- Genus: †Zambellichthys
- Species: †Z. bergamensis

Binomial name
- †Zambellichthys bergamensis Arratia, 2013

Extinct genus of fishes

Zambellichthys is an extinct genus of pholidophorid that lived during the Norian stage of the Late Triassic epoch.

== Distribution ==
Zambellichthys bergamensis is known from fossils found in Italy.
