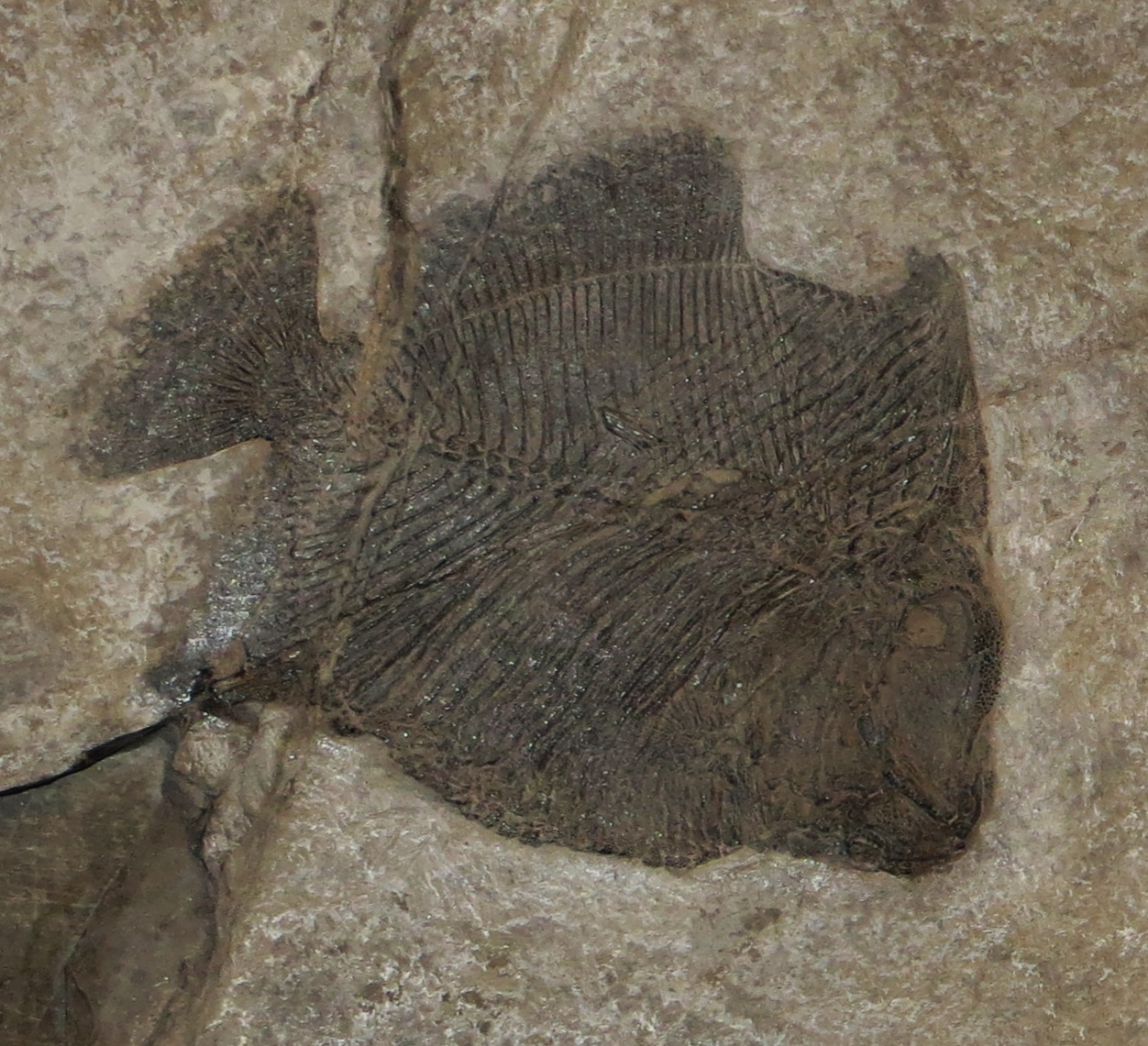
- Specimen of Brembodus

Scientific classification
- Kingdom: Animalia
- Phylum: Chordata
- Class: Actinopterygii
- Order: †Pycnodontiformes
- Family: †Brembodontidae; Tintori, 1981

Genera
- Brembodus; Eomesodon; Gibbodon

= Brembodontidae =

Brembodontidae Temporal range: Late Triassic (Norian) to Early Jurassic

Family of fishes

Brembodontidae is a family of pycnodontiform fish from the Late Triassic (Norian) to the Early Jurassic of Europe. It contains three genera, along with one undescribed genus containing the species "Eomesodon" hoeferi. They represent some of the earliest known pycnodonts, which would go on to become one of the dominant fish groups in the succeeding Jurassic and Cretaceous periods. This family briefly survived the Triassic-Jurassic extinction event.
