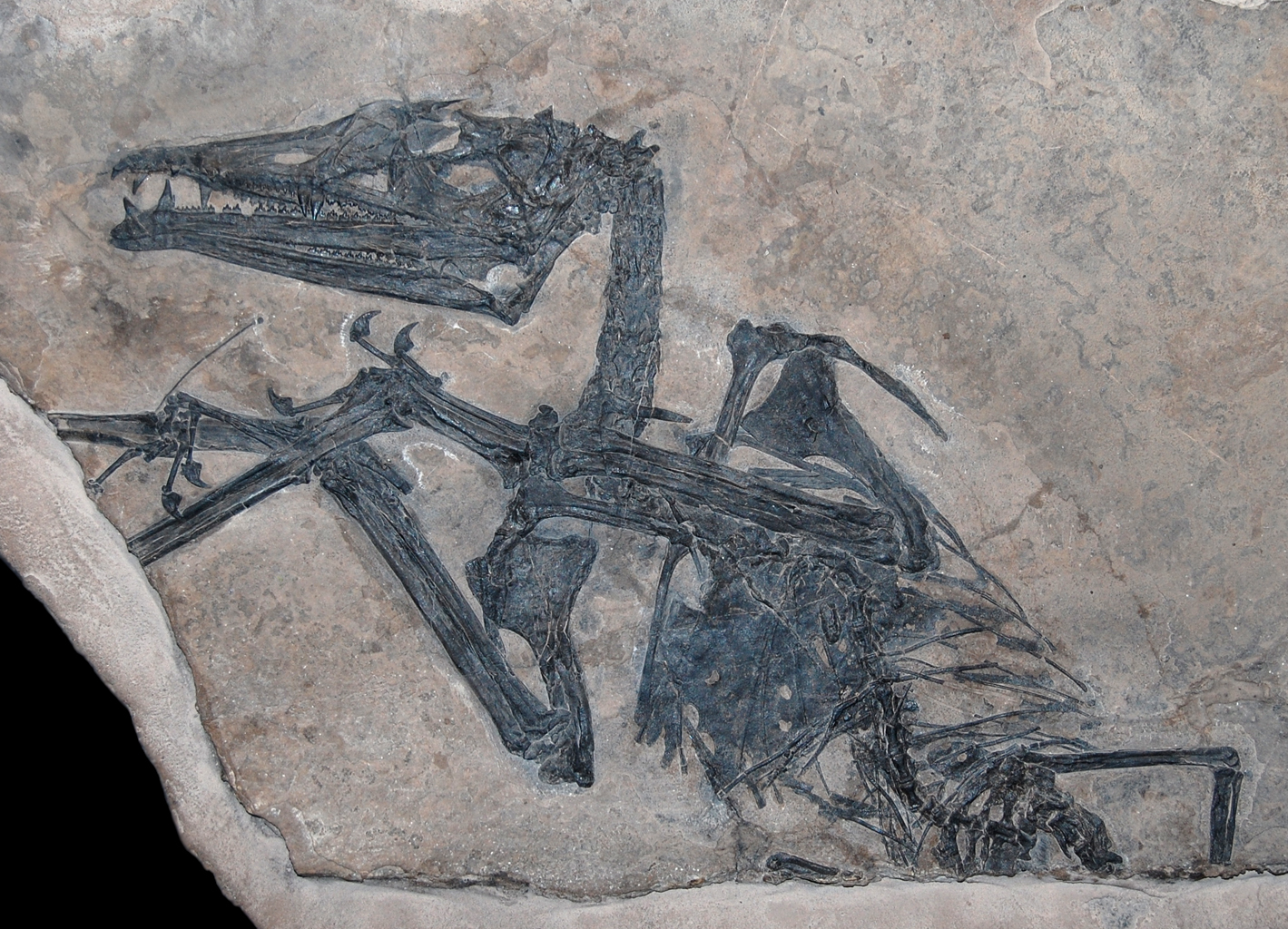
- MCSNB 2888 in Bergamo

Scientific classification
- Kingdom: Animalia
- Phylum: Chordata
- Class: Reptilia
- Order: †Pterosauria
- Family: †Eudimorphodontidae
- Subfamily: †Eudimorphodontinae
- Genus: †Eudimorphodon; Zambelli, 1973
- Species: †E. ranzii

Binomial name
- †Eudimorphodon ranzii Zambelli, 1973

= Eudimorphodon =

Eudimorphodon Temporal range: Late Triassic, 219–215 Ma

Extinct genus of pterosaur

Eudimorphodon is an extinct genus of pterosaur that was discovered in 1973 by Mario Pandolfi in the town of Cene, Italy and described the same year by Rocco Zambelli. The nearly complete skeleton was retrieved from shale deposited during the Late Triassic (mid to late Norian stage, 219-215 million years ago), making Eudimorphodon one of the oldest pterosaurs known. It had a wingspan of about 100 centimeters (3.3 ft). Eudimorphodon is known from several skeletons, including juvenile specimens.

== Discovery and species ==
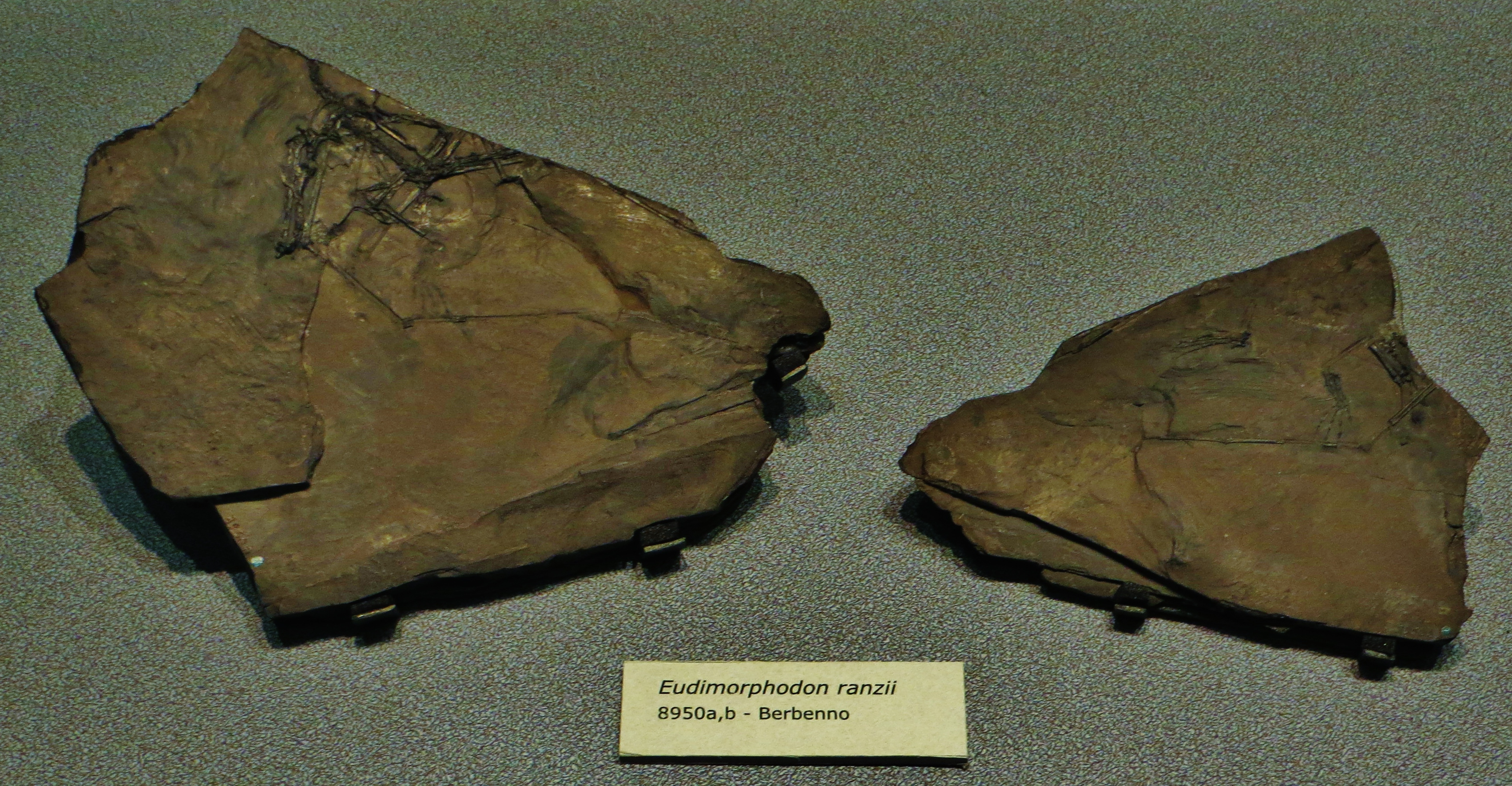
Fossil at Museo di Scienze Naturali, Bergamo, specimens MCSNB 8959 a,b

Eudimorphodon currently includes one species, the type species Eudimorphodon ranzii, which was first described by Zambelli in 1973. It is based on holotype MCSNB 2888. The specific name honors Professor Silvio Ranzi. A second species, Eudimorphodon rosenfeldi, was named by Dalla Vecchia in 1995 for two specimens found in Italy. However, further study by Dalla Vecchia found that these actually represented a distinct genus, which he named Carniadactylus in 2009. A third species is Eudimorphodon cromptonellus, described by Jenkins and colleagues in 2001. It is based on a juvenile specimen with a wingspan of just 24 centimeters, MGUH VP 3393, found in the early nineties in Jameson Land, Greenland. Its specific name honors Professor Alfred Walter Crompton; the name is a diminutive because the exemplar is so small. In 2015 it was named as a separate genus Arcticodactylus by Alexander Kellner. Specimen BSP 1994 I 51, in 2003 referred to a cf E. ranzii, was in 2015 by Kellner made the genus Austriadraco.

In 1986 fossil jaw fragments containing multicusped teeth were found in Dockum Group rocks in western Texas. One fragment, apparently from a lower jaw, contained two teeth, each with five cusps. Another fragment, from an upper jaw, also contained several multi-cusped teeth. These finds are very similar to Eudimorphodon and may be attributable to this genus, although without better fossil remains it is impossible to be sure.

Many fossils have been found that once were referred to Eudimorphodon, making Eudimorphodon represent one of the most abundant pterosaurs from Italy. Today, these have largely been made separate genera.

== Description ==
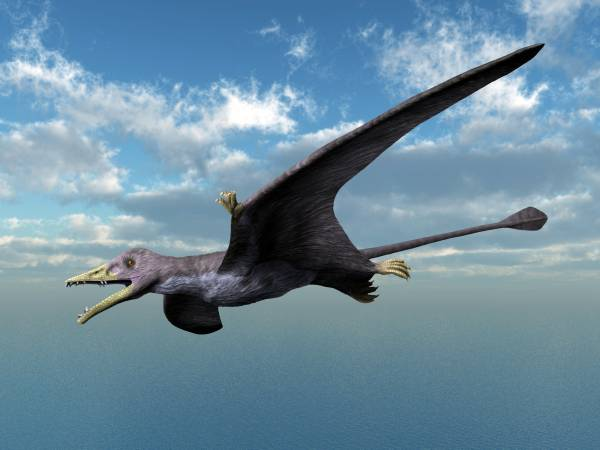
Restoration

Eudimorphodon was a small pterosaur, being 1 meter (3.3 ft) in length, and weighing no more than 10 kilograms (22 lb). Its fourth finger had a very large size, and attached to the membrane making up the wing.

Eudimorphodon showed a strong differentiation of the teeth, hence its name, which is derived from ancient Greek for "true dimorphic tooth". It also possessed a large number of these teeth, a total of 110 of them densely packed into a jaw only 6 centimeters (2.4 in) long. The front of the jaw was filled with fangs, per side four in the upper jaw, two in the lower jaw, that rather abruptly gave way to a line of smaller multipointed teeth, 25 in the upper jaw, 26 in the lower jaw, most of which had five cusps

The morphology of the teeth are suggestive of a piscivorous diet, which has been confirmed by preserved stomach contents containing the remains of fish of the genus Parapholidophorus. Young Eudimorphodon had slightly differing dentition with fewer teeth and may have had a more insectivorous diet. The top and bottom teeth of Eudimorphodon came into direct contact with each other when the jaws were closed, especially at the back of the jaw. This degree of dental occlusion is the strongest known among pterosaurs. The teeth were multi-cusped, and tooth wear shows that Eudimorphodon was able to crush or chew its food to some degree. Wear along the sides of these teeth suggests that Eudimorphodon also fed on hard-shelled invertebrates. The teeth distinguish Eudimorphodon, because almost all other pterosaurs either had simple teeth, or lacked them altogether. Benson et al. (2012) noticed that the teeth would have been perfect for grabbing and crushing fish.

== Phylogeny and classification ==
Despite its great age, Eudimorphodon has few primitive characteristics making the taxon of little use in attempting to ascertain where pterosaurs fit in the reptile family tree. Basal traits though, are the retention of pterygoid teeth and the flexibility of the tail, which lacks the very long stiffening vertebral extensions other long-tailed pterosaurs possess. The paucity of early pterosaur remains has ensured that their evolutionary origin continues to be a mystery, with different experts suggesting affinities to dinosaurs, archosauriformes, or prolacertiformes.

Within the standard hypothesis that the Dinosauromorpha are the pterosaurs' close relatives within an overarching Ornithodira, Eudimorphodon is also unhelpful in establishing relationships within Pterosauria between early and later forms because then its multicusped teeth should be considered highly derived, compared to the simpler single-cusped teeth of Jurassic pterosaurs, and a strong indicator that Eudimorphodon is not closely related to the ancestor of later pterosaurs. Instead it is believed to be a member of a specialized off branch from the main "line" of pterosaur evolution, the Campylognathoididae. The following phylogenetic analysis follows the topology of Upchurch et al. (2015).

- Eopterosauria
  - - Preondactylus buffarinii
    - Austriadactylus cristatus
  - - Peteinosaurus zambellii
    - Eudimorphodontoidea
      - Raeticodactylidae
        - Raeticodactylus filisurensis
        - Caviramus schesaplanensis
      - Eudimorphodontidae
        - Arcticodactylus cromptonellus
        - - Carniadactylus rosenfeldi
          - Eudimorphodon ranzii

In 2020 however, a study upheld by Matthew G. Baron about early pterosaur interrelationships found Eudimorphodon to group with the clade Novialoidea, both within the clade called Lonchognatha.

== See also ==
- List of pterosaur genera
- Timeline of pterosaur research
