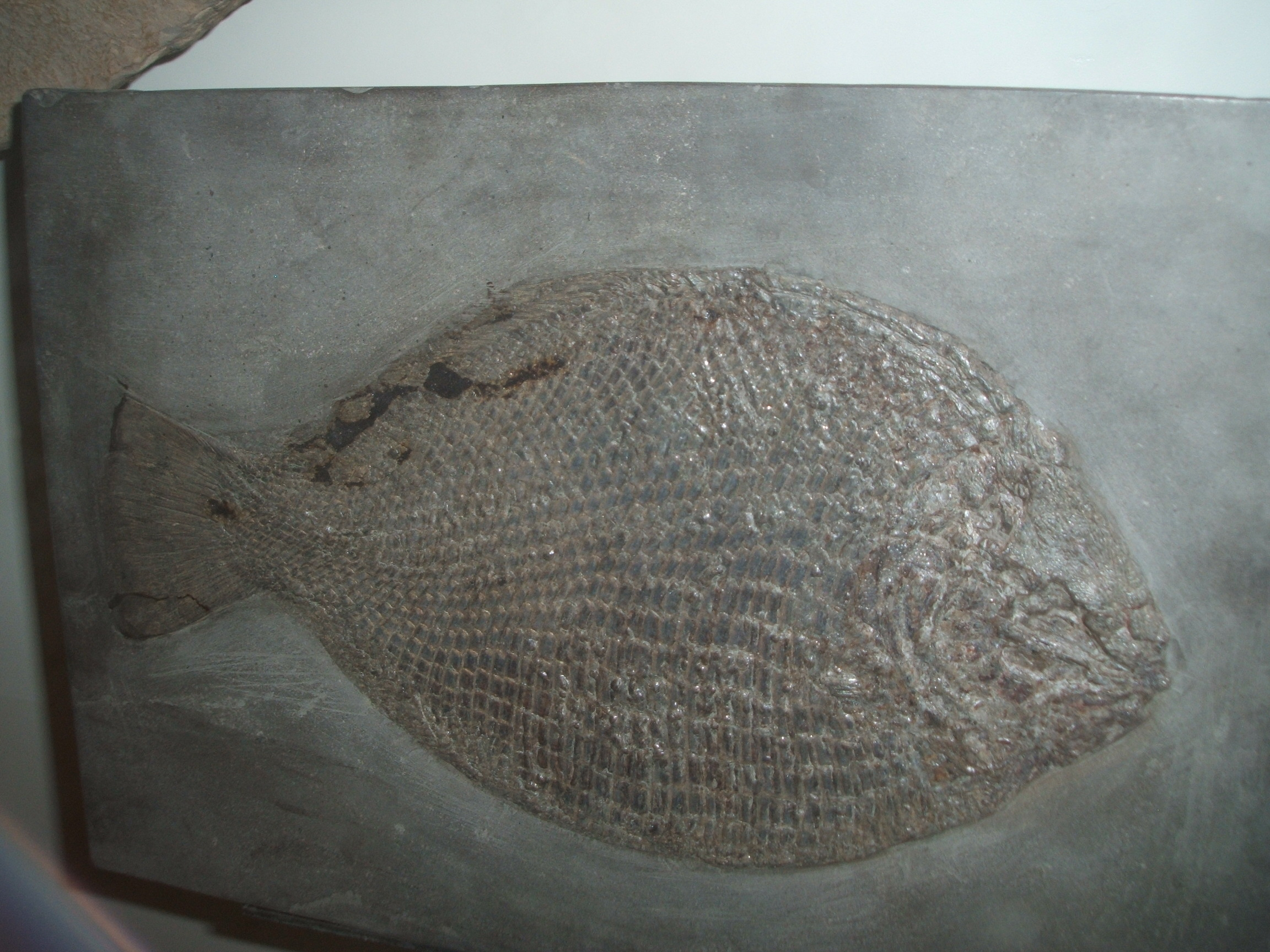
- Specimen of D. pholidotum, American Museum of Natural History

Scientific classification
- Kingdom: Animalia
- Phylum: Chordata
- Class: Actinopterygii
- Family: †Dapediidae
- Genus: †Dapedium; Leach, 1822

Type species
- †Dapedium politum Leach, 1822

Species
- 15+, see text

Synonyms
- †Dapedius Agassiz, 1835

= Dapedium =

Dapedium Temporal range: Late Triassic to Middle Jurassic Norian–Aalenian

Extinct genus of ray-finned fishes

Dapedium (from Greek: δαπέδων dapédon, 'pavement') is a genus of deep-bodied ray-finned fish belonging to the extinct family Dapediidae. Dapedium lived in the Late Triassic to the Middle Jurassic period, from the late Norian to the early Aalenian, being one of the most abundant fossil fish found in Early Jurassic deposits in Europe.

== Taxonomy and evolution ==
The genus Dapedium was named by William Elford Leach in 1822, with the type species being D. politum named from remains from the Early Jurassic Lower Lias of Lyme Regis in Dorset, England. In 1835 Louis Agassiz, one of the most important fossil fish researchers of the 19th century, renamed the genus to the masculine form Dapedius as he did for all fossil fish he named. Subsequently, for the rest of the 19th century and most of the 20th century, Dapedius was the predominant used name for the fish, until scholarship in the late 20th century and early 21st century found that Dapedium was the correct name for the genus because it had priority.

=== Species ===
The following species are known:

- D. angulifer (Agassiz, 1832) - Early Jurassic (early Hettangian) of England (Blue Lias) (=Tetragonolepis traillii Agassiz, 1832)
- D. ballei Maxwell & López-Arbarello, 2018 - Middle Jurassic (early Aalenian) of Germany (Opalinuston Formation)
- D. caelatum Quenstedt, 1858 - Early Jurassic (early-middle Toarcian) of Germany (Posidonia Shale)
- D. colei Agassiz, 1835 - Early Jurassic (late Hettangian/early Sinemurian) of England (Blue Lias)
- D. dorsalis (Agassiz, 1836) - Early Jurassic (Hettangian/Pliensbachian) of England ("Lower Lias")
- D. granulatum Agassiz, 1835 - late Hettangian/earliest late Sinemurian of England (Blue Lias/Charmouth Mudstone)
- D. magnevillei (Agassiz, 1836) - early Toarcian of France ("Upper Lias")
- D. milloti Sauvage, 1891 - early Toarcian of France
- D. noricum Tintori, 1983 - Late Triassic (late Norian) of Italy (Zorzino Limestone)
- D. orbis Agassiz, 1836 - Hettangian/Pliensbachian of England ("Lower Lias")
- D. pholidotum (Agassiz, 1832) - early-middle Toarcian of Germany (Posidonia Shale)
- D. politum Leach, 1822 - early Sinemurian to earliest late Sinemurian of England (Blue Lias/Charmouth Mudstone)
- D. punctatum Agassiz, 1835 - early Sinemurian to Pliensbachian of England (Blue Lias/Charmouth Mudstone)
- D. stollorum Thies & Hauff, 2011 - early-middle Toarcian of Germany (Posidonia Shale)

The complete fossil of an indeterminate Dapedium is known from the Toarcian of Hungary, marking the only known specimen of this genus from eastern Europe. An indeterminate species is known from the Moltrasio Formation of Italy. Records from India are thought to be erroneous.

The monophyly of the genus has been questioned, with a number of studies suggesting the genus is probably paraphyletic.

=== Evolution ===
Dapedium appears to have been relatively rare during the Triassic, especially compared to other members of its family, but saw a large burst in diversification in the wake of the Triassic-Jurassic extinction event. It is thought that most Triassic dapediids had highly specialized feeding strategies or had less armor compared to the heavily-scaled, generalist Dapedium, allowing it to survive the extinction event. Dapedium is one of the most diverse and abundant genera of ganoid fish during Early Jurassic in Europe. Its remains are known from many appropriately-aged lagerstätten throughout western Europe, with some records also known from eastern Europe. These adaptations may have also enabled Dapedium to survive a second extinction event, the Toarcian Oceanic Anoxic Event, although the abundance of Dapedium saw a dramatic decline around the time of the TOAE, and it went extinct shortly afterwards.

== Description ==
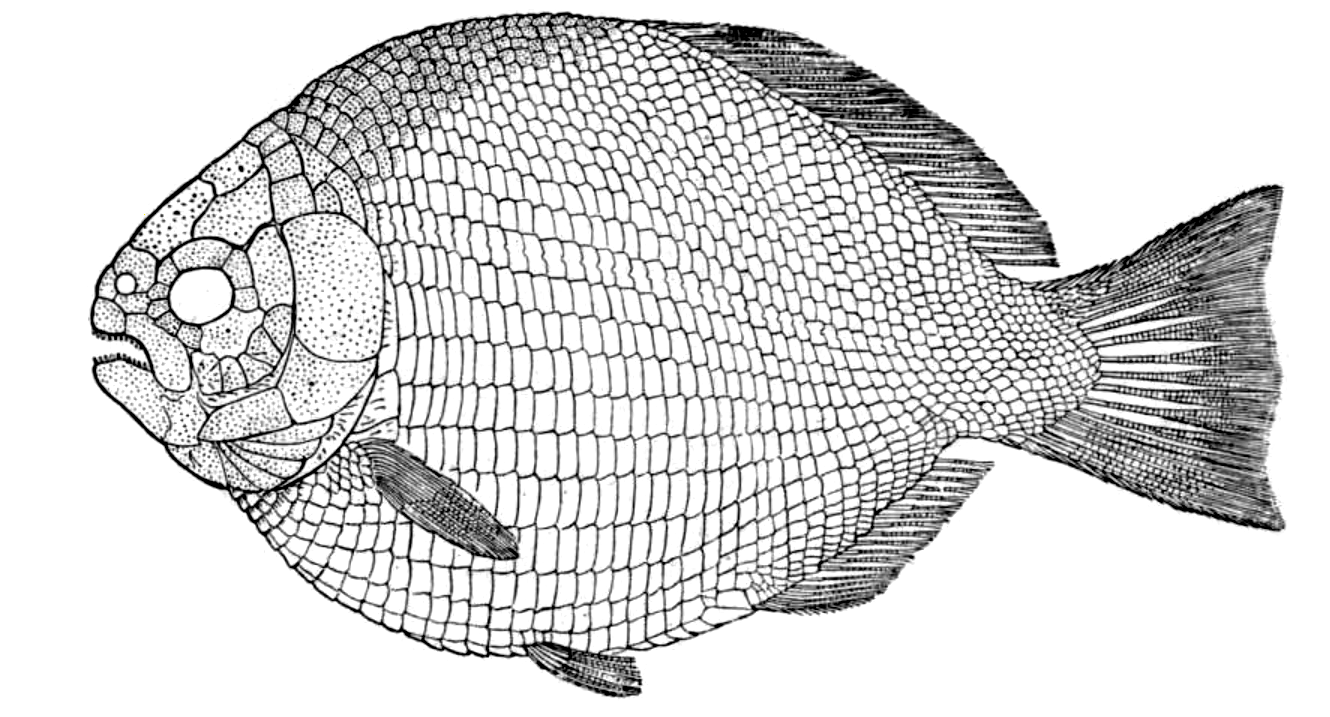
Historical reconstruction of the scale covering, fins and skull of Dapedium from 1889

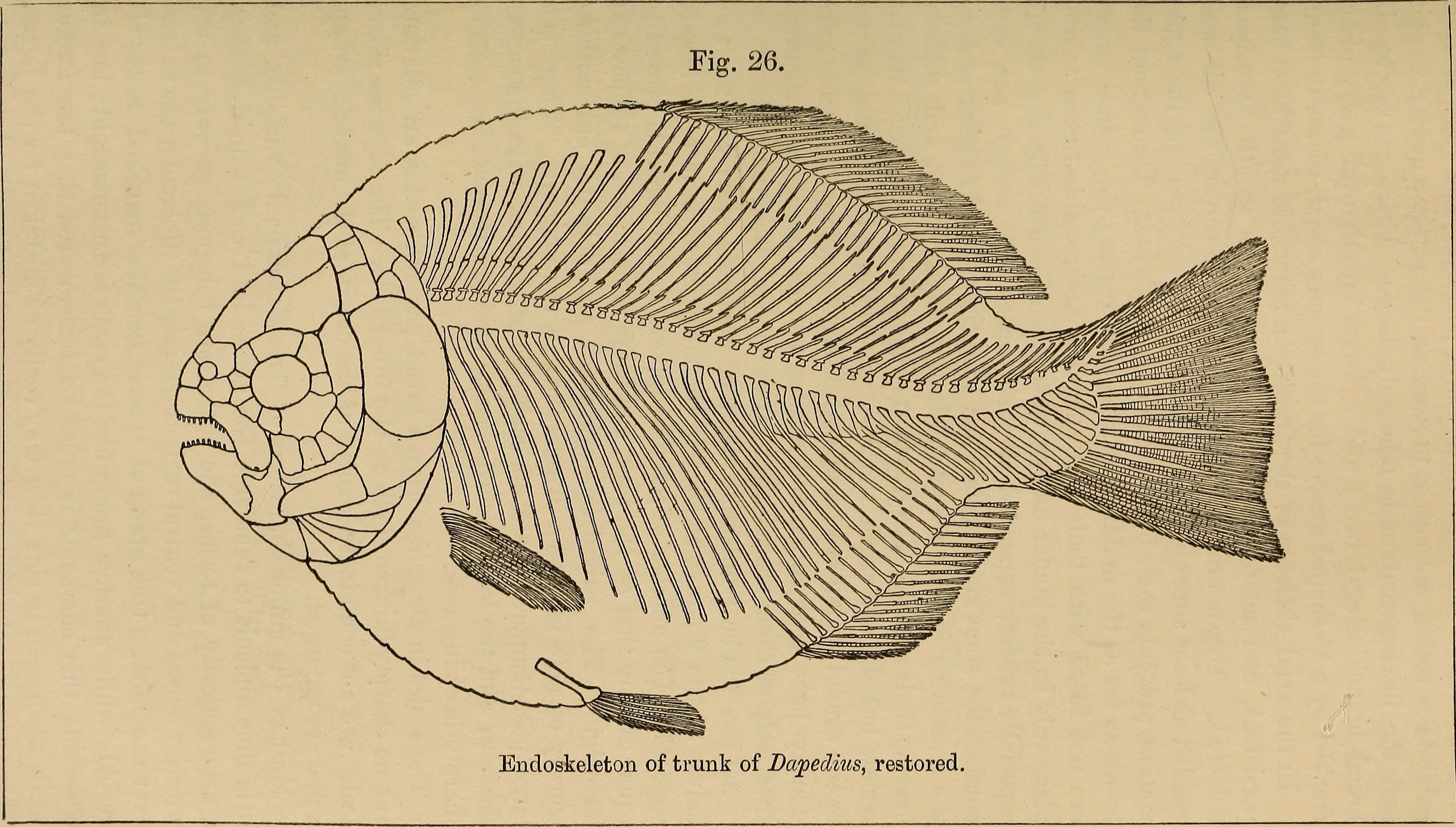
Historical reconstruction of the skeleton of Dapedium with the scales removed from 1889

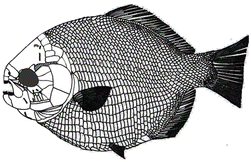
Modern reconstruction of Dapedium pholidotum

The various species of Dapedium ranged from 8 to 50 centimetres (3.1 to 19.7 in) long, and all had a deep, oval to near-circular body that was narrow from side-to side (laterally). The skin was covered with thick ganoid scales. The dorsal and anal fins had a hem-like (elongate but short) morphology. The skull is distinguished by the following characters: "circumorbital bones comprising a series of infraorbitals and a series of suborbitals; vertical branch of preoperculum covered by suborbitals to a varying extent". The mandible was robustly built and the marginal teeth at the edge of the mouth composed of styliform (relatively elongate and slender) teeth either being single cusped or bicusped (bearing two cusps). In the interior of the mouth, including on the prearticular and coronoid bones of the lower jaw and the vomer, palatoquadrate, dermopalatine and possibly the entopterygoid bones of the skull bore smaller teeth, with those on the vomer being less than 1 millimetre (1/32 in) across, with the dense covering of small teeth forming batteries.

Dapedium is a morphologically conservative genus that shows relatively little change over its 35 million year evolutionary history, though the species show differences in the placement of the pectoral fin, and the ornamentation pattern of the scales (tuberculated or smooth), and the shape of the skull bones.

== Distribution ==
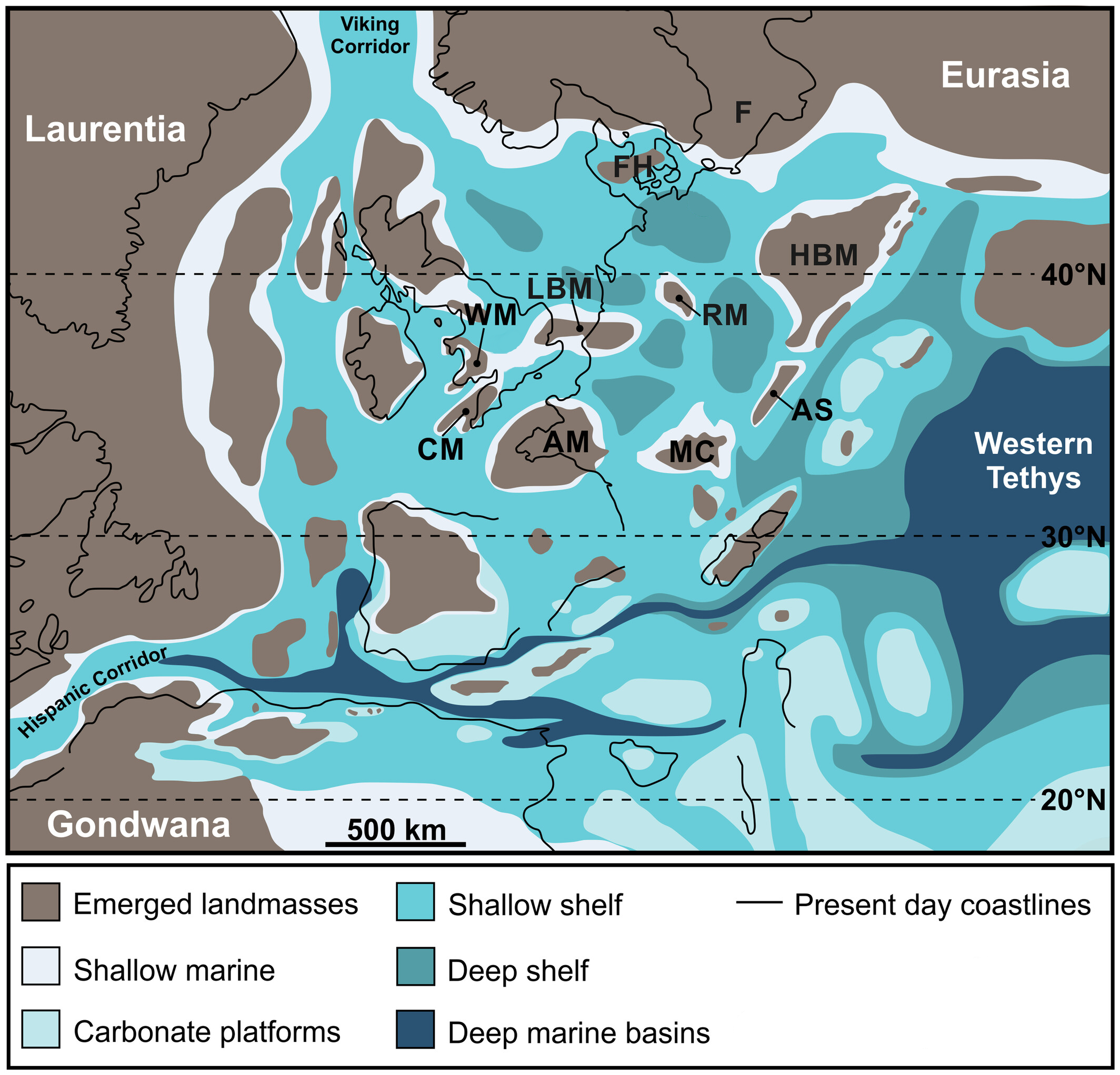
Paleogeographic map of Europe and the western Tethys during the Toarcian age of the Early Jurassic

Dapedium lived in the waters of the western Tethys Ocean surrounding Europe. Remains of Dapedium species have been found in Italy, the United Kingdom (including Lyme Regis, Dorset), France, Germany and Hungary.

== Ecology ==
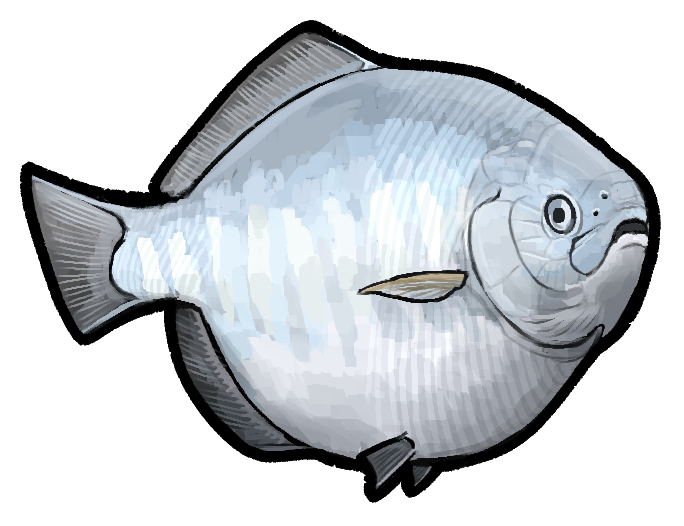
Life restoration

Dapedium is thought to have been durophagous predator that was capable of consuming hard shelled organisms, using its slender marginal teeth to grasp and manipulate prey, before crushing them between the smaller teeth in the interior of the mouth. However, based on other evidence Dapedium is suggested to have been a relatively generalist predator which was not exclusively durophagous. One specimen of Dapedium punctatum has been found with a smaller fish, probably Dorsetichthys, within its jaws. Species of Dapedium likely engaged in scavenging, as indicated by the finding of a specimen of Dapedium of indeterminate species within the body cavity of the ammonite Lytoceras, which the Dapedium had likely become stuck in and died in an attempt to scavenge. Its position within the water column (either living in open water or close to the seafloor) is uncertain and may have been variable between species, with the youngest species D. ballei suggested to possibly be pelagic.
