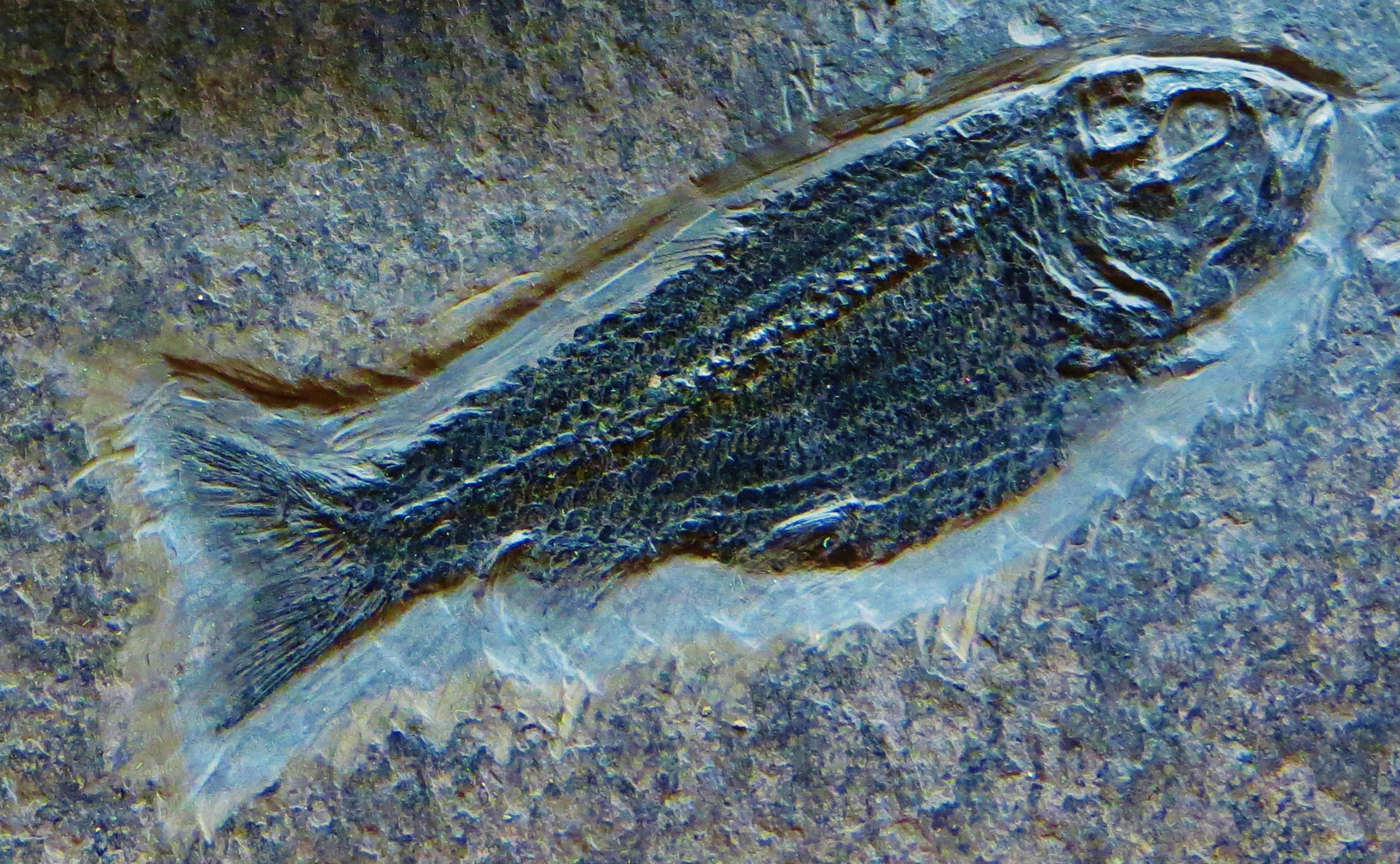
- Pholidoctenus serianus

Scientific classification
- Kingdom: Animalia
- Phylum: Chordata
- Class: Actinopterygii
- Order: †Pholidophoriformes
- Family: †Pholidophoridae
- Genus: †Pholidoctenus; Zambelli, 1978

= Pholidoctenus =

Extinct genus of fishes

Pholidoctenus is an extinct genus of prehistoric ray-finned fish.

== See also ==
- Prehistoric fish
- List of prehistoric bony fish
