= Museo Civico Scienze Naturali Enrico Caffi =

Civic Museum of Natural Science Enrico Caffi
- Museo Civico Scienze Naturali Enrico Caffi
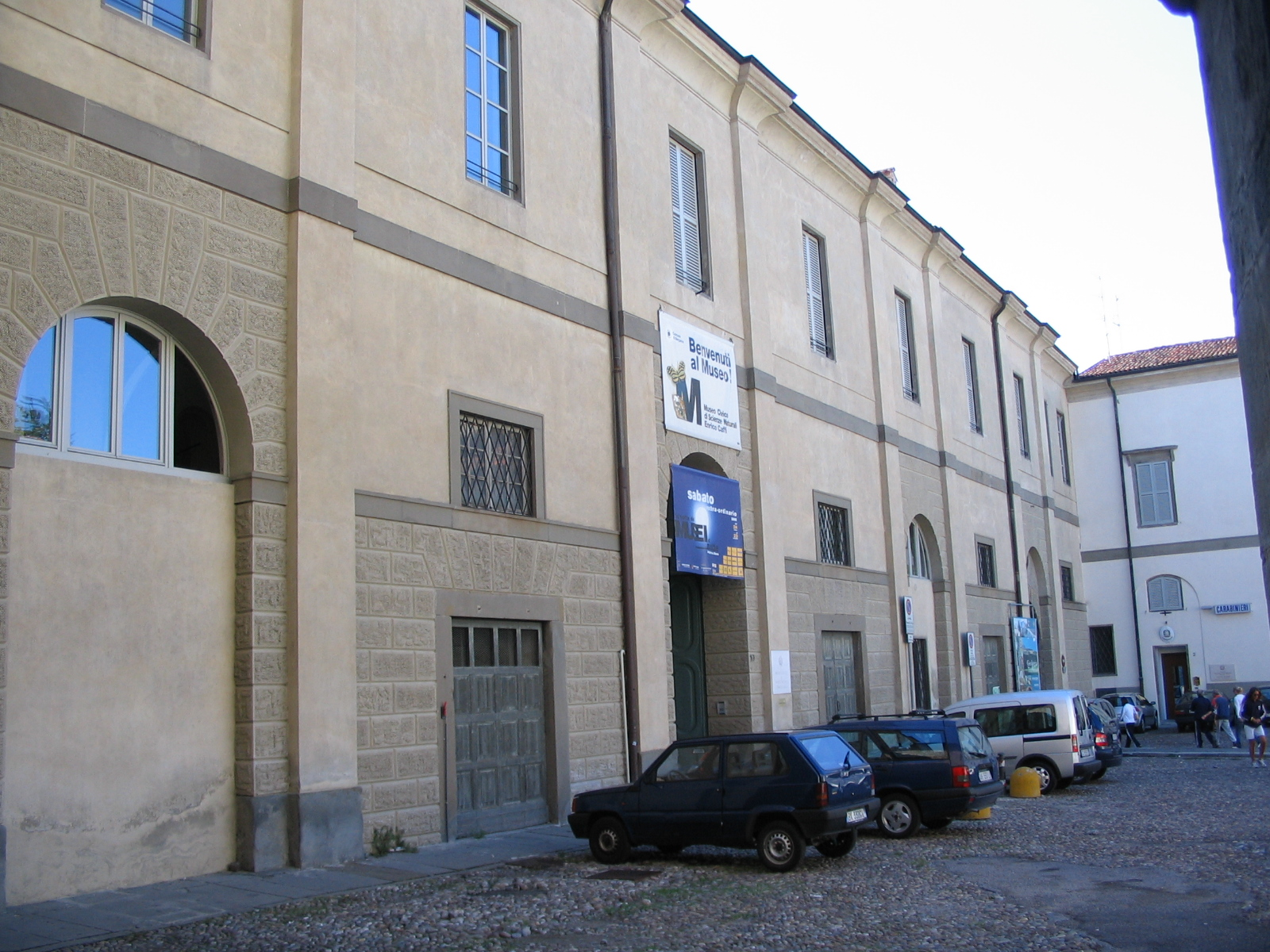
- Established: 1918
- Location: Piazza Cittadella 10, Bergamo, Italy
- Coordinates: 45°42′20″N 9°39′34″E
- Type: Natural history museum
- Public transit access: Bergamo railway station
- Website: www.museoscienzebergamo.it/web/

Civic Museum of Natural Science Enrico Caffi (Italian: Museo di Scienze Naturali Enrico Caffi) is a natural history museum in Bergamo, Italy. The museum has more than 55,000 artifacts, fossils, animal and plant specimens. The museum is founded in 1918 and, after multiple moves, is currently located at Piazza Cittadella. The museum also hosts a library and provides education activities for schools in the region.

== History ==
The origin of the museum could be traced back to the end of the 19th century. In 1871, the first exhibitions were held during public holidays, consisted of collections of memorabilia and artifacts from the Royal Technical Institute Vittorio Emanuele II. These collections made up the initial collection of the museum. At the time, the headquarters of the Royal Technical Institute was in the lower city, in the Palazzo della Pretura Nuova at Via Tasso 1. In 1873, the institute was moved to Piazza Vecchia in the Palazzo Nuovo.

On 14 July 1918, the museum was inaugurated and opened at Palazzo Nuovo. The initiative to split the museum from the institute was approved in 1917 during a meeting of the city council. On 13 January 1920, Dottore Enrico Caffi was appointed as the first director of the museum. He remained at his post until 1947. During his tenure, he initiated projects to reorganize and catalog all the findings, including the ones which the institute had added. The catalogues he had created is still important today, not only as part of the museum's collection, but because it also contains historical testimonies. As an expert in Bergamo Orobie area, he also devoted his time to study the flora and fauna of the area. He left behind massive quantities of important publications and manuscripts — scientific articles of his findings, summary lists containing systematic groups of the species in the region, geological maps of the territory as well as vocabulary lists containing terms of the animals and plants.

In 1928, during Caffi's tenure, the museum underwent two major moves. First move in 1922, was limited to the transport of artifact, specimens and memorabilia and shelves from the upper floor. The second, and more challenging, move took place between 1 August and 10 November 1927, when the museum's collections were moved to a venue on the east side of Piazza Vecchia and Via Bartolomeo Colleoni. The museum was reopened on 1 July 1928. The management and council hall, a library, a laboratory, an entomology room, a herbarium and the curator room were located on the first floor. On the second floor, there were sections dedicated to the mineral collection, fossil exhibits, ethnography as well as two other rooms for a laboratory and storage.

From 1947 to 1955 Professor Virgilio Taramelli took over from Enrico Caffi. In 1955, Professor Antonio Valle succeeded Virgilio Taramelli and remained at his post until 1979. During his tenure, great strides were made in the expansion of the museum. In addition to expanding the collections, he also created a section for scientific research. In-depth studies were made on scorpions and mites, which led to considerable knowledge on the physiology and biology of these groups, as witnessed from the rich collection of documents as well as the significant collections of scorpions and mites owned by the museum. Valle also promoted research to be done on the region with particular attention paid to aspects related to the quality of the environment, such as the study of Lake Endine, the Brembo and Serio rivers and some springs in the plains of Bergamo. In the early 1960s, an agreement was signed between the Municipality of Bergamo and the University of Milan for the opening of the Institute of Earth Sciences and, subsequently, Zoology, in Piazza Cittadella.

The considerable expansion of the museum's collections of documents, manuscripts and writings due to research, as well as the research activities themselves, led to the need for increased space for conservation and studies. In November 1957, work began on Visconti Complex at Piazza Citadella, the future site of the Civic Museum of Natural Science. The complex underwent major renovations which were led by architect Sandro Angelini. On 29 June 1960, the new headquarters for the museum, Visconti Complex, Piazza Citadella, was inaugurated. This event was attended by President of the Council of Ministers of Italy, Fernando Tambroni.

In 1973, the fossil of the oldest well known flying creature was found in Seriana Valley, Cene during an excavation. Lived more than 200 million years ago, the Eudimorphodon ranzii was first described by Rocco Zambelli, who then, was responsible for paleontology section of the museum. In 1979, Mario Guerra was appointed as the director of the museum. He took the same line of management approach as Valle and remained on his post until 1997. As an expert ornithologist, he devoted his time to study birds, not only from the region but also from East Africa. His keen interest on the study and teaching of taxidermy techniques led to workshops aimed at training young taxidermists. As a skilled illustrator, he produced large number of realistic illustrations of his subjects, characterized by his unique style and accuracy which depicted his in-depth knowledge of the subjects.

In 1980, he edited the first edition of the "Magazine of the Civic Museum of Natural Sciences E. Caffi", which since then, had published numerous articles related to natural science, with particular attention paid to the activities carried out by the museum. In 1982, he directed the reconstruction of the mammoth which currently looms over the museum entrance.

Nowadays, the exhibition is located on the first floor while the offices, laboratories and collection storage are located on the second and third floors. In recent years, new halls for temporary exhibitions have been added, as well as two laboratories for educational purposes. Sensory pathways with Braille captions for the blind have also been added.

== Gallery ==
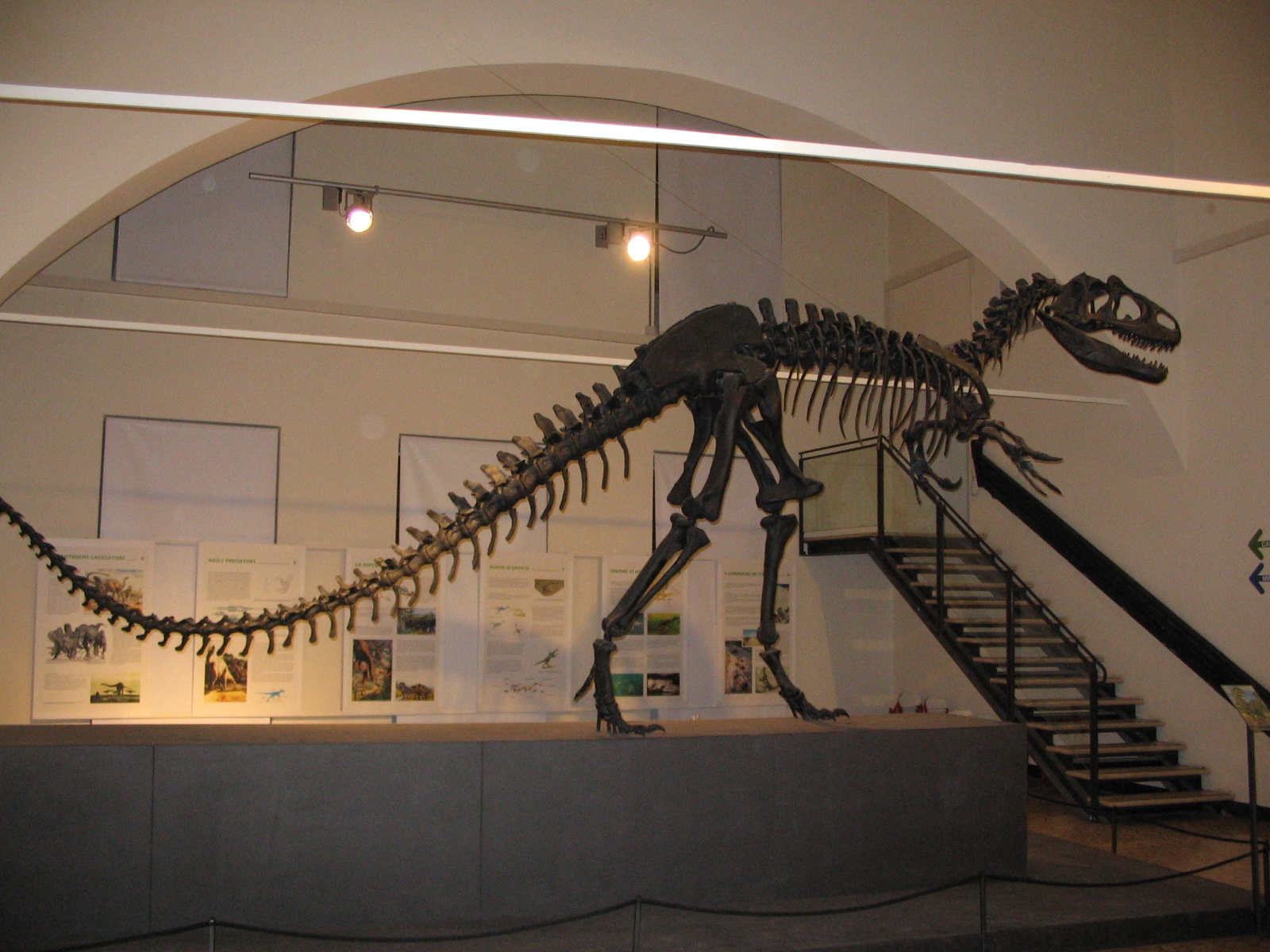
Allosaurus fragilis

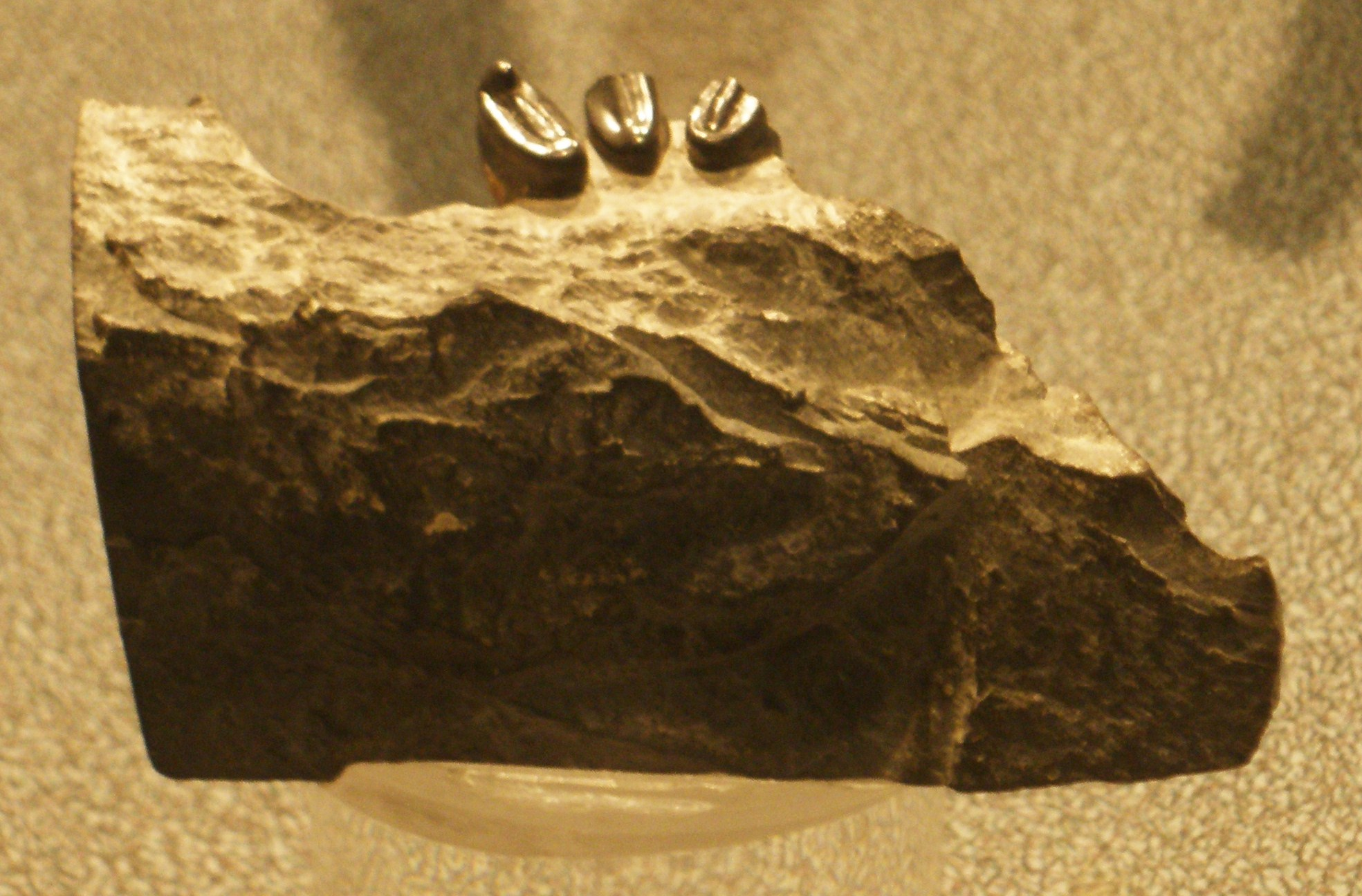
Gornogomphodon

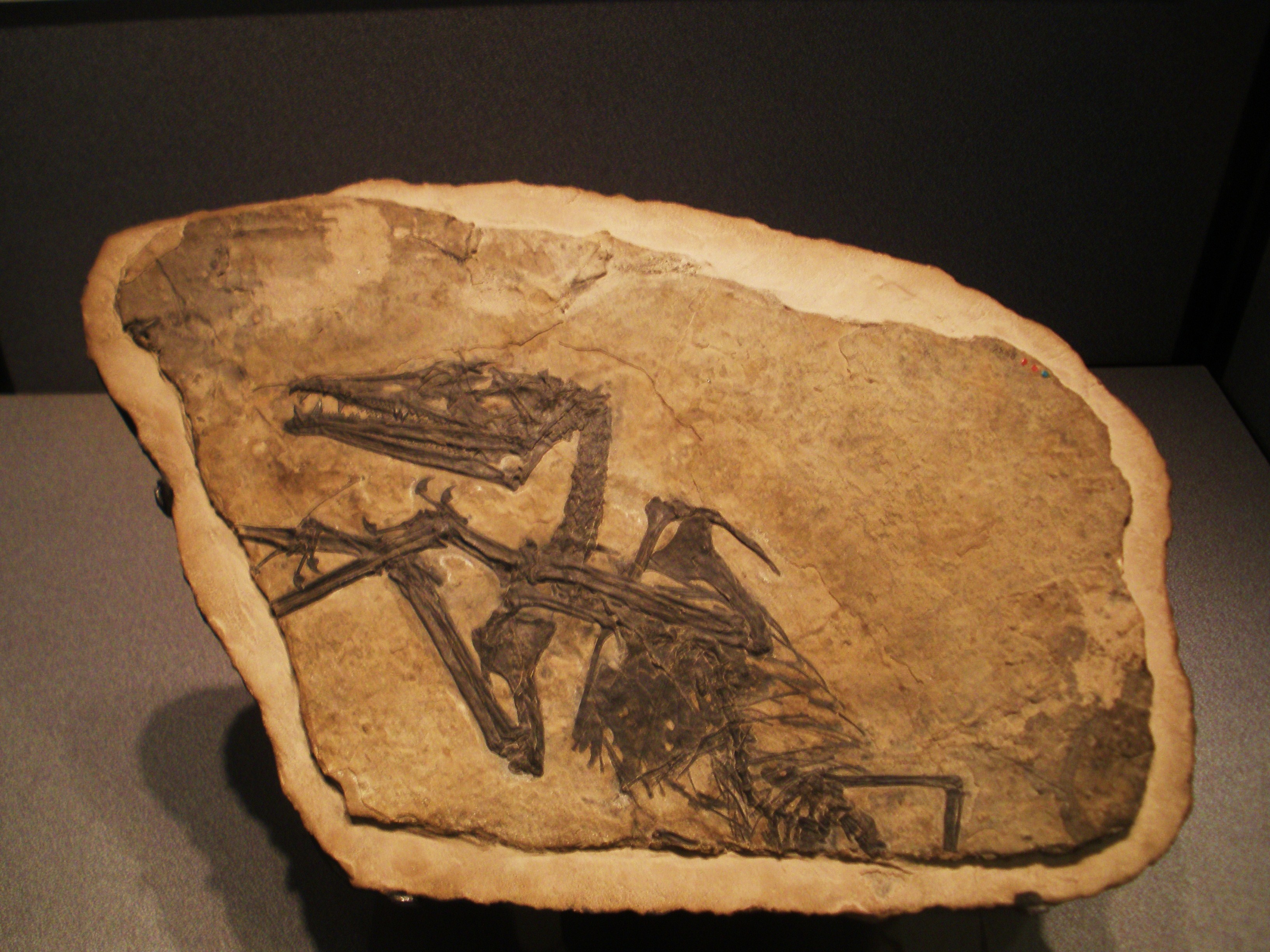
Eudimorphodon

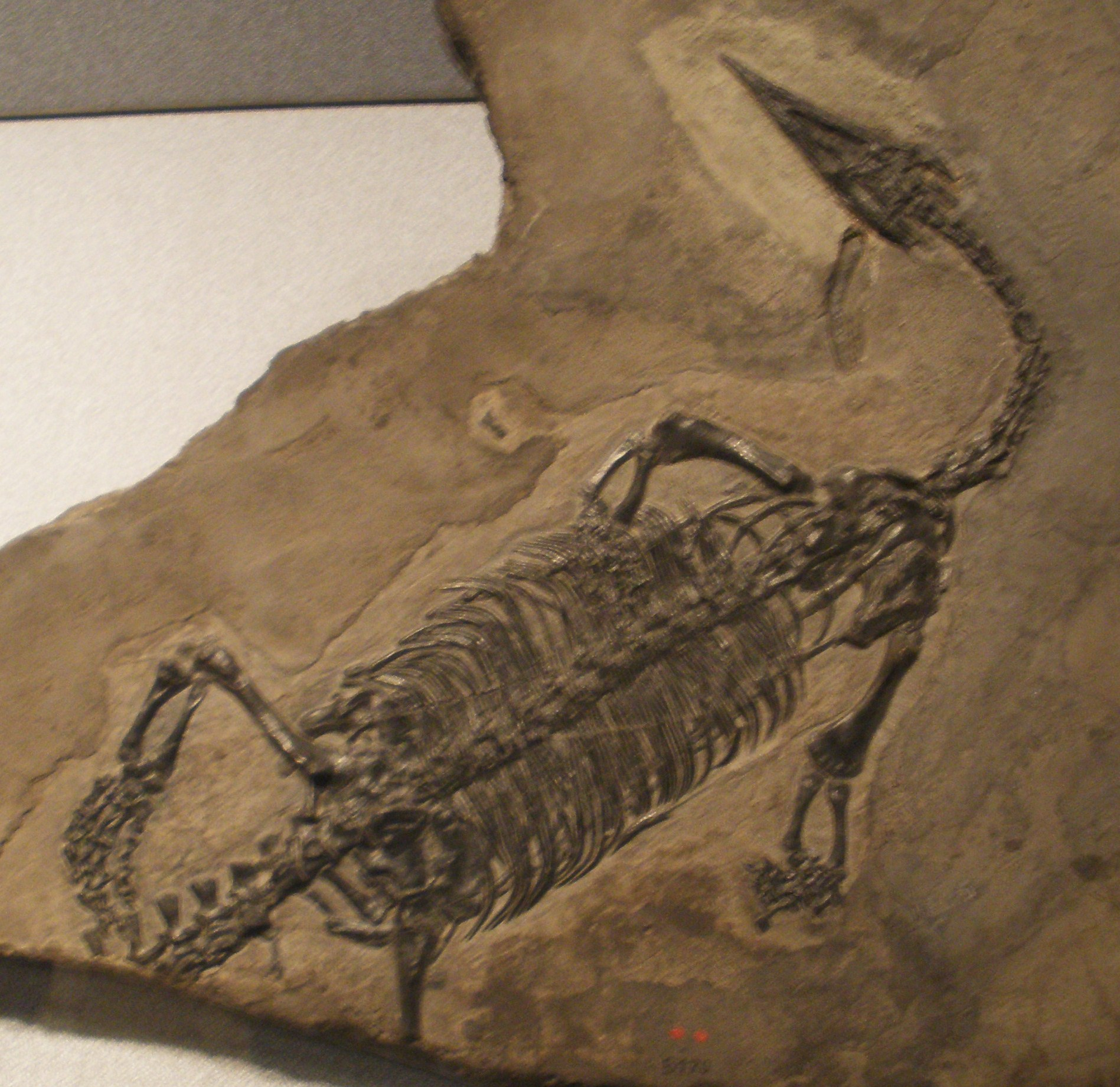
Endennasaurus

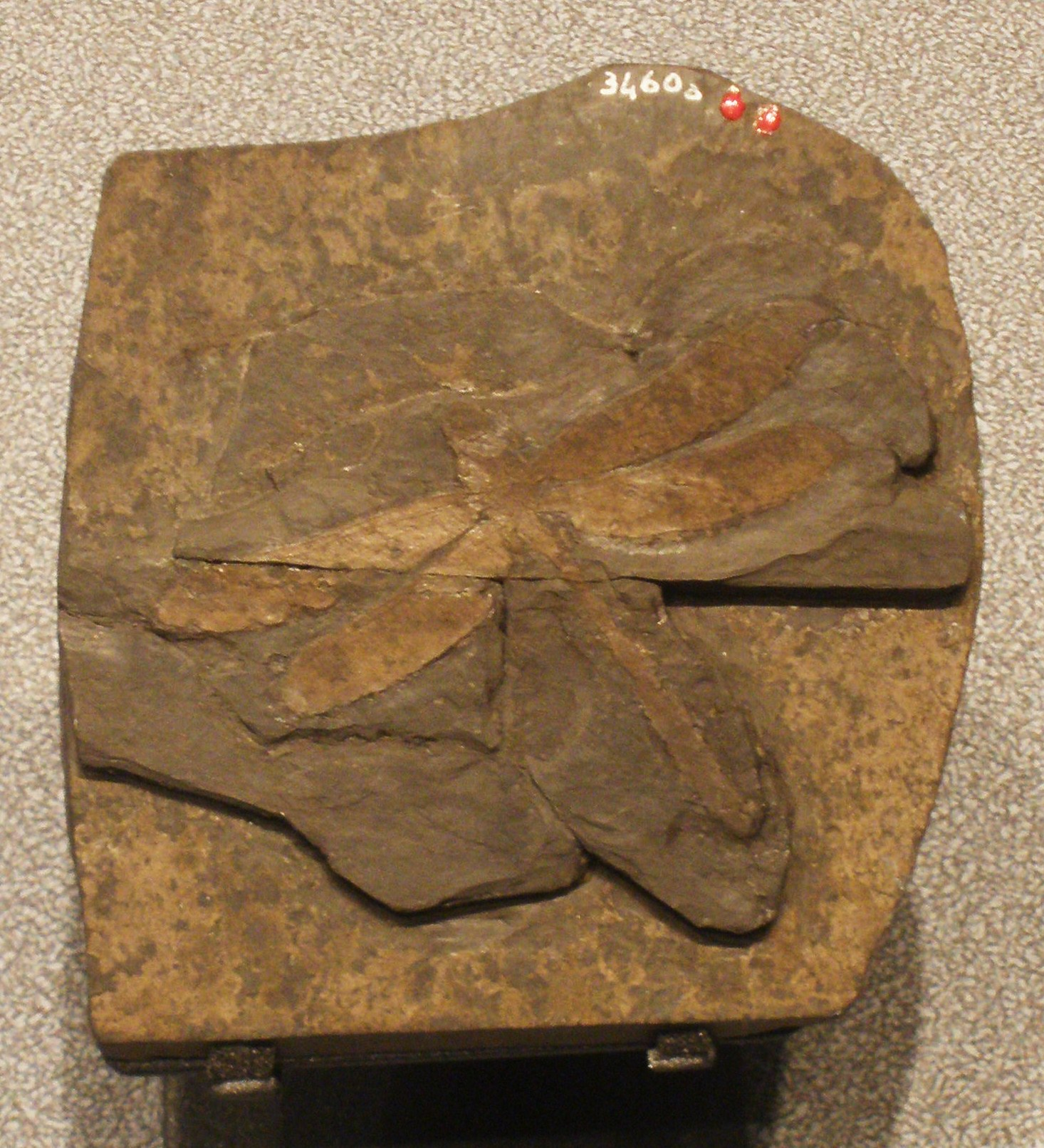
Italophlebia

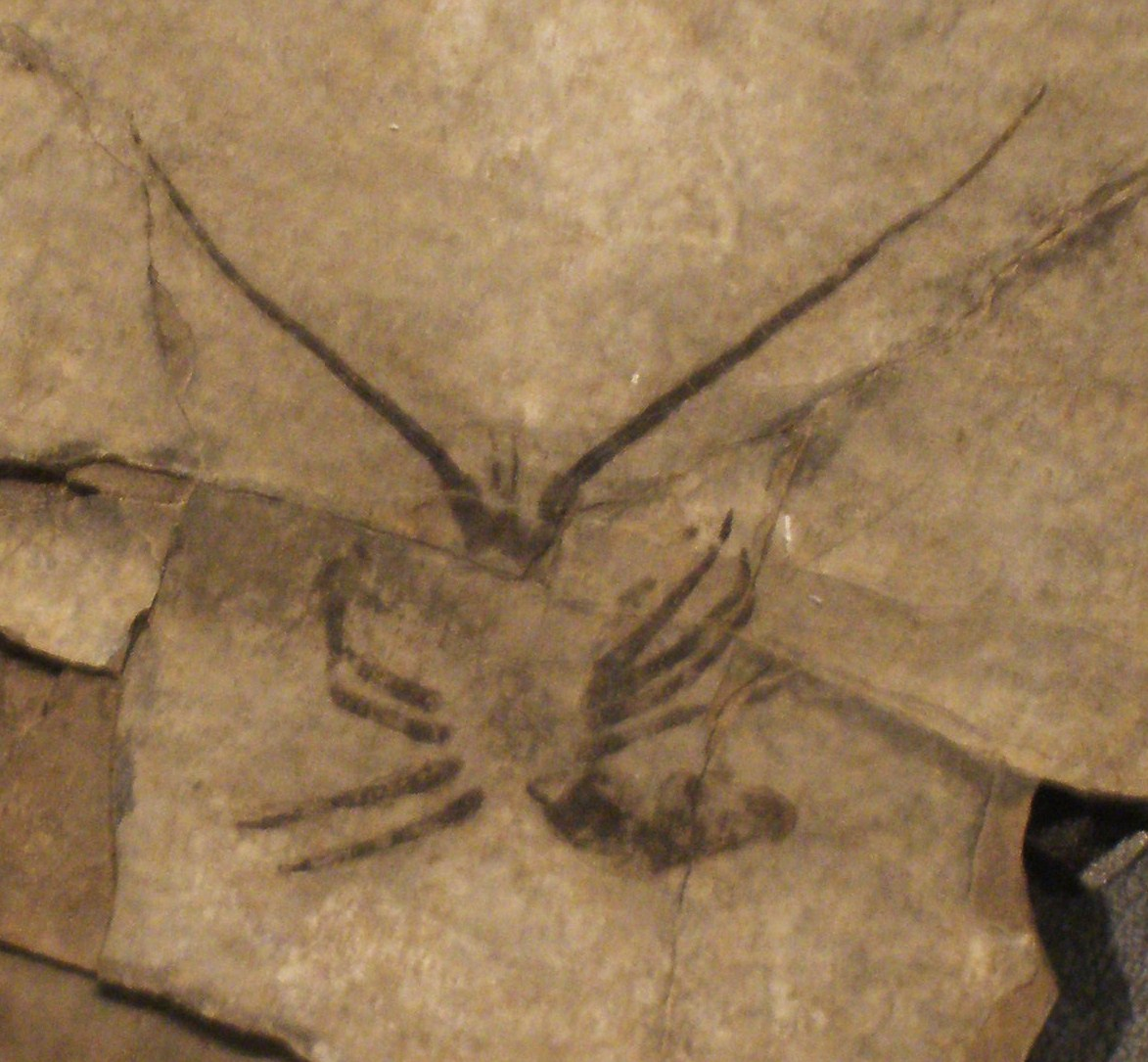
Archaeopalinurus
