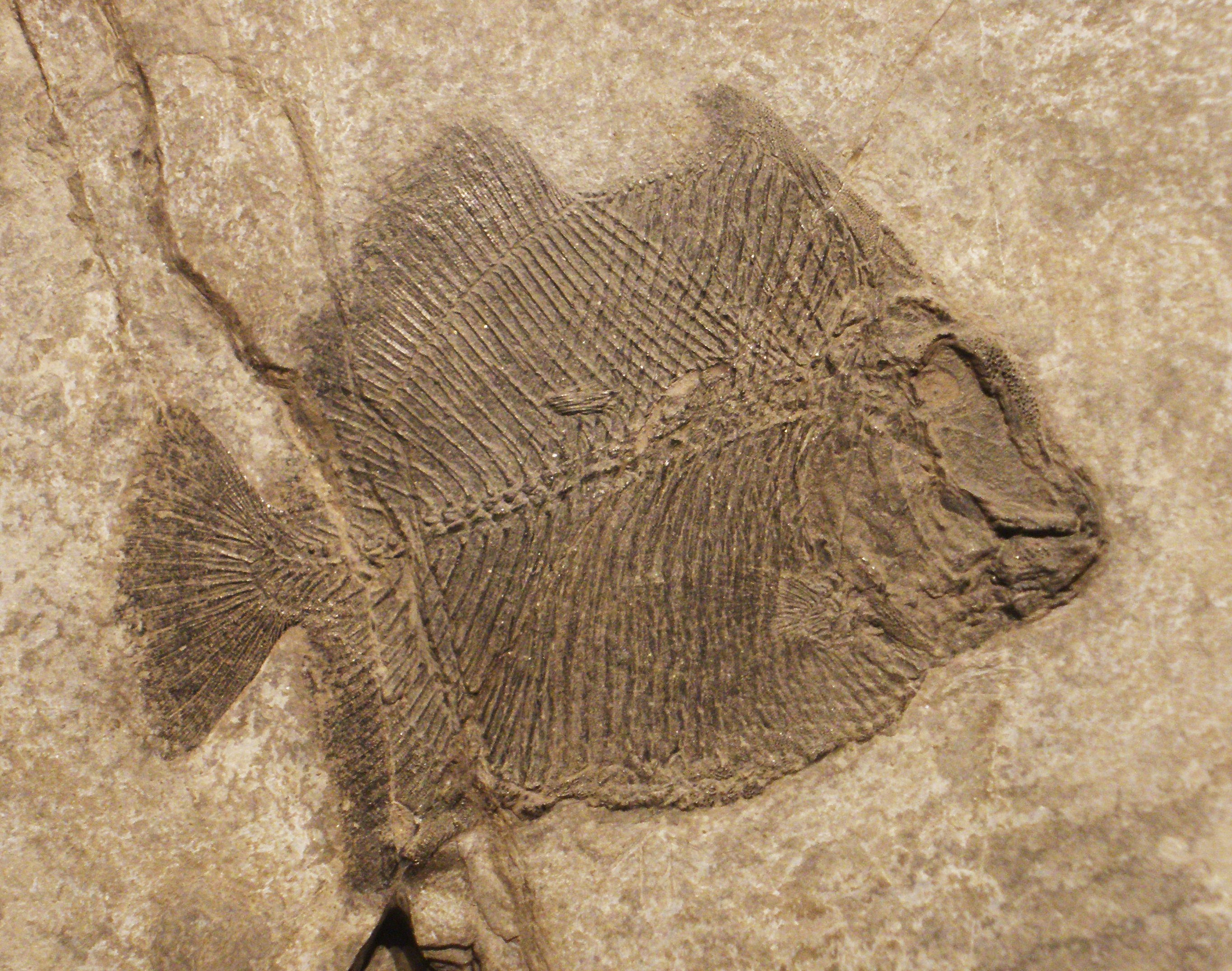
- B. ridens

Scientific classification
- Kingdom: Animalia
- Phylum: Chordata
- Class: Actinopterygii
- Order: †Pycnodontiformes
- Family: †Brembodontidae
- Genus: †Brembodus; Tintori, 1981
- Species: †B. ridens

Binomial name
- †Brembodus ridens Tintori, 1981

= Brembodus =

Brembodus Temporal range: Late Triassic (Norian)

Extinct genus of fishes

Brembodus is an extinct marine pycnodontid fish, the type genus of the family Brembodontidae. It contains a single species, B. ridens, known from the Late Triassic Calcare di Zorzino formation of Cene, Italy.

== See also ==
- Gibbodon
- Pycnodontiformes
- Prehistoric fish
- List of prehistoric bony fish
