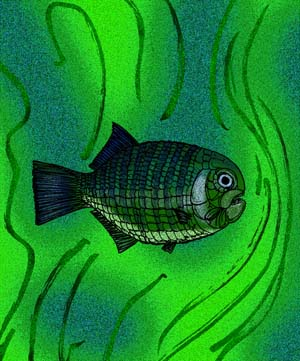
- Artist's reconstruction

Scientific classification
- Kingdom: Animalia
- Phylum: Chordata
- Class: Actinopterygii
- Family: †Dapediidae
- Genus: †Dandya; Tintori, 1983
- Species: †D. ovalis

Binomial name
- †Dandya ovalis (Gorjanovic-Kramberger, 1905)

Synonyms
- Spaniolepis ovalis Gorjanovic-Kramberger, 1905

= Dandya ovalis =

Dandya ovalis Temporal range: Middle Norian

Extinct genus of ray-finned fishes

Dandya is an extinct genus of marine ray-finned fish belonging to the family Dapediidae. It contains one species, D. ovalis. It is known from the Late Triassic-aged Zorzino Limestone of Lombardy, northern Italy and the Seefeld Formation of Austria.
