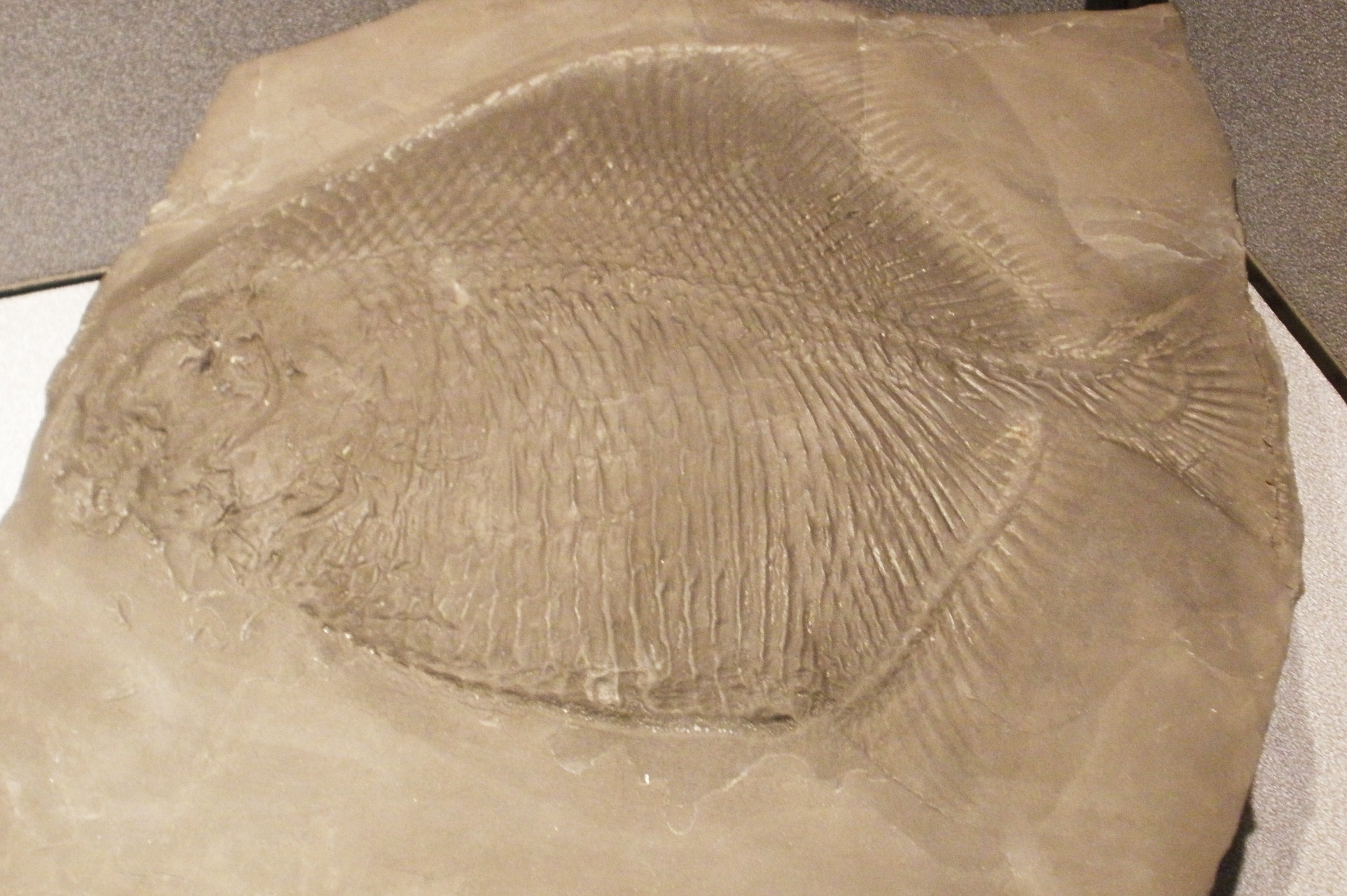
- Fossil
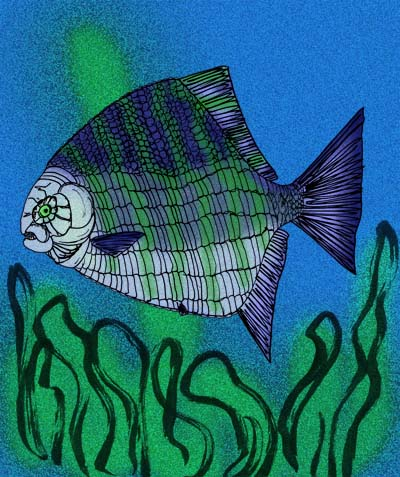
- Artist's reconstruction

Scientific classification
- Kingdom: Animalia
- Phylum: Chordata
- Class: Actinopterygii
- Clade: Ginglymodi
- Order: †Semionotiformes (?)
- Family: †Dapediidae
- Genus: †Sargodon; Plieninger, 1847

Type species
- †Sargodon tomicus Plieninger, 1847

= Sargodon =

Sargodon Temporal range: Ladinian–Rhaetian

Extinct genus of ray-finned fishes

Sargodon is an extinct genus of neopterygian ray-finned fish that lived during the Middle and Late Triassic epochs in what is now Europe.

The type and only species is Sargodon tomicus.

== Occurrence ==
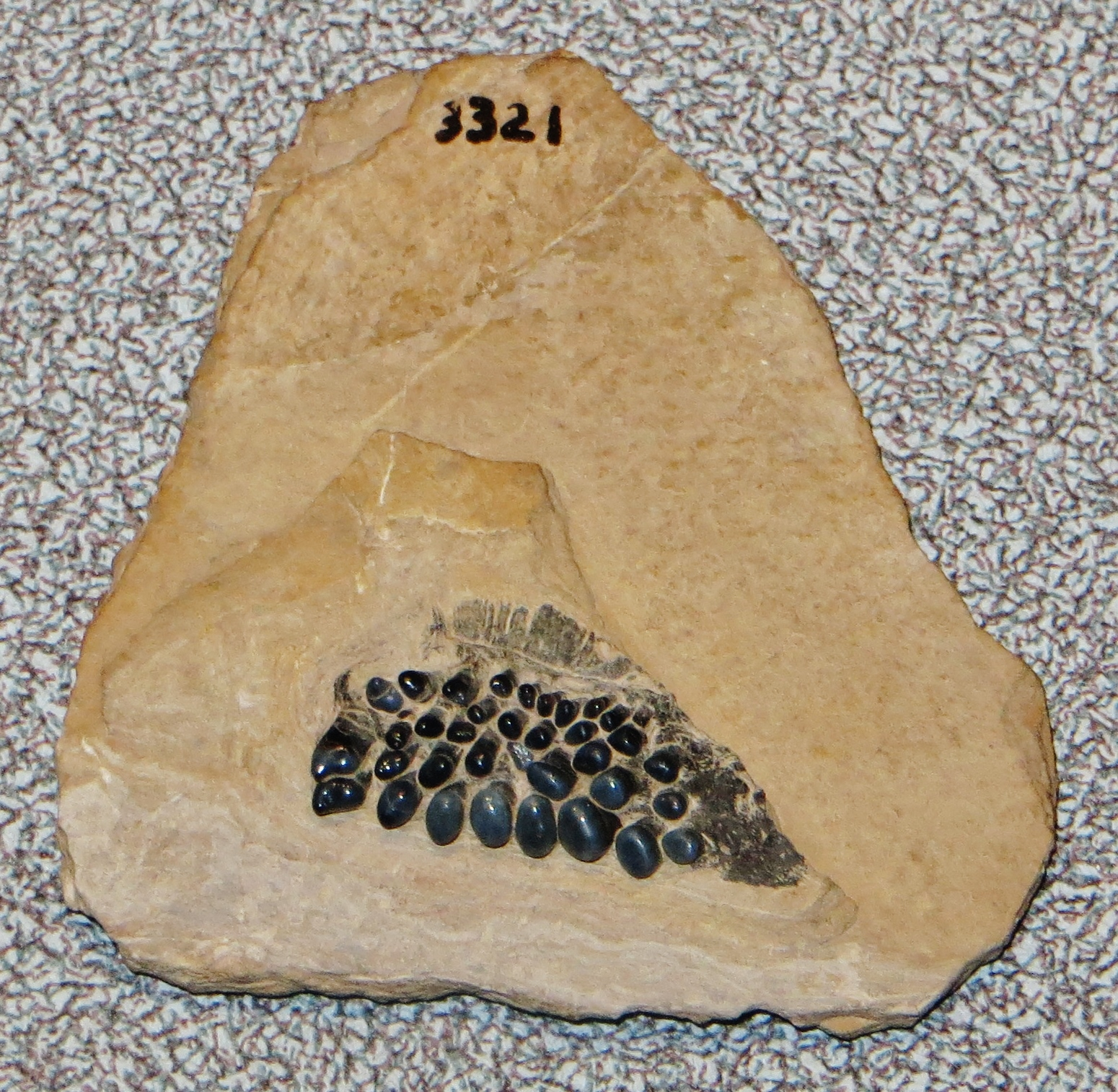
Isolated tooth plate from Cene, Italy

Fossils of Sargodon tomicus are found in rocks of Ladinian (late Middle Triassic) to Rhaetian (latest Triassic) age. Remains have been described from Austria (Lower Austria, Vorarlberg), England, Italy (Campania, Lombardy), Germany (Baden-Württemberg), Poland (Tatra Mountains) and Switzerland (Graubünden). It is known from both complete specimens, which could reach body lengths of about 1 m (3.3 ft), and isolated dental plates that provided a triturating surface, suggesting that these animals fed on shelled organisms.

== See also ==
- Prehistoric fish
- List of prehistoric bony fish
