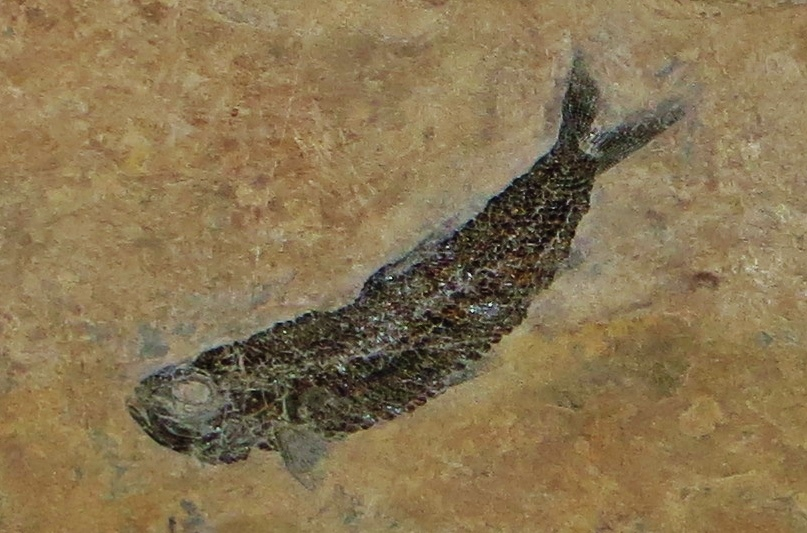
- A fossil of P. nybelini in Museo Civico Scienze Naturali Enrico Caffi (in Bergamo, Lombardy, Italy)

Scientific classification
- Domain: Eukaryota
- Kingdom: Animalia
- Phylum: Chordata
- Class: Actinopterygii
- Order: †Pholidophoriformes
- Family: †Pholidophoridae
- Genus: †Parapholidophorus; Zambelli, 1975

= Parapholidophorus =

Extinct genus of fishes

Parapholidophorus is an extinct genus of prehistoric bony fish.

== See also ==
- Prehistoric fish
- List of prehistoric bony fish
