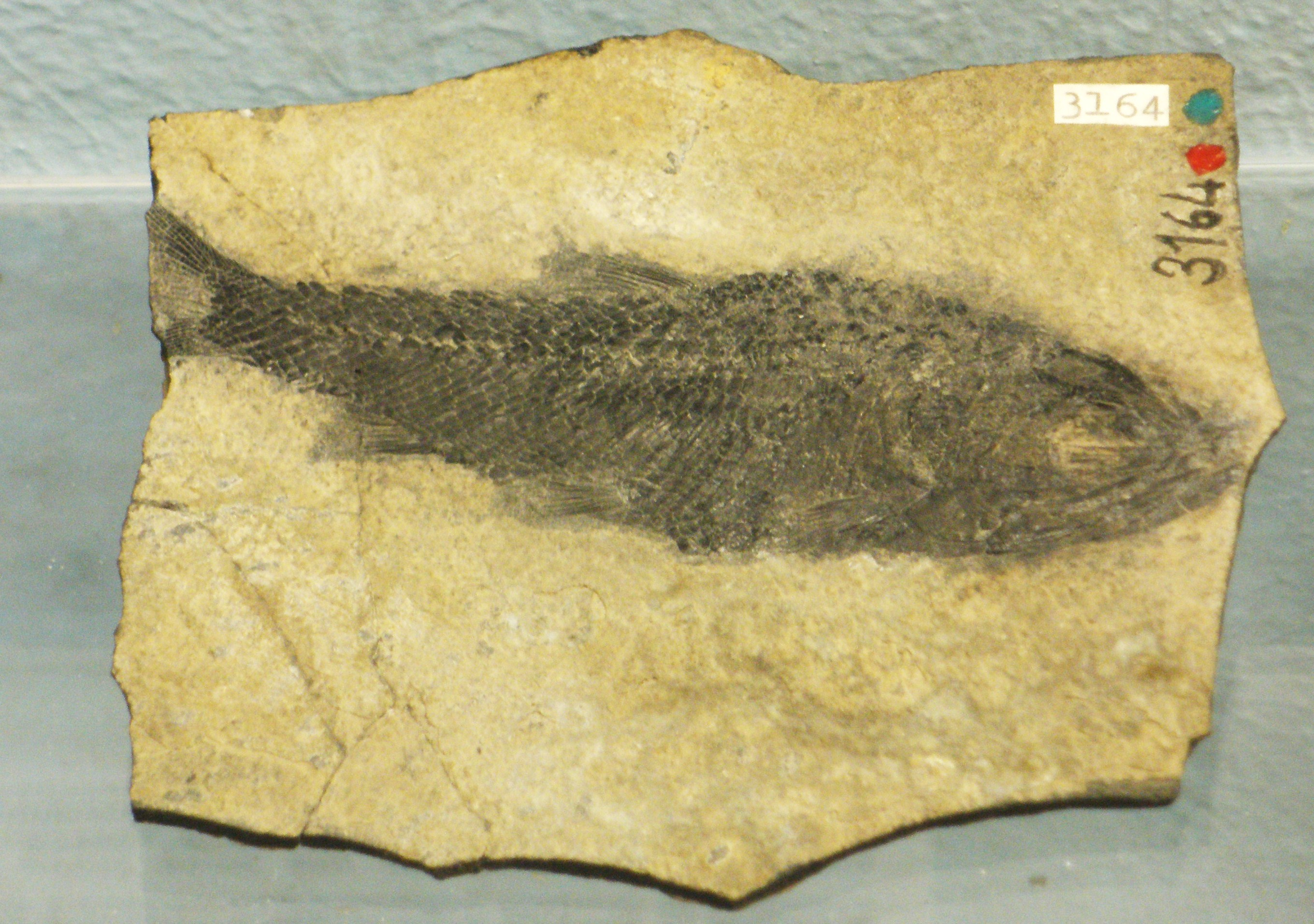
- Fossil of Pholidorhynchodon malzanni

Scientific classification
- Kingdom: Animalia
- Phylum: Chordata
- Class: Actinopterygii
- Order: †Pholidophoriformes
- Family: †Pholidophoridae; Woodward, 1890

Genera
- †Annaichthys Arratia, 2013; †Ceneichthys Taverne & Capasso, 2015; †Eopholidophorus Zambelli, 1989; †Knerichthys Arratia, 2013; †Lombardichthys Arratia, 2017; †Malingichthys Tintori et al., 2015; †Parapholidophorus Zambelli, 1975; †Pholidoctenus Zambelli, 1977; †Pholidophoretes Griffith, 1977; †Pholidophorus Agassiz, 1832 (Type); †Pholidorhynchodon Zambelli, 1980; †Pseudopholidoctenus Arratia & Schultze, 2024; †Zambellichthys Arratia, 2013

= Pholidophoridae =

Pholidophoridae Temporal range: Anisian–Norian

Extinct family of ray-finned fishes

Pholidophoridae is an extinct family of primitive stem-teleost fish that lived during the Triassic period, from the Anisian age of the Middle Triassic to the Norian age of the Late Triassic. Most of the genera are from Europe, but one (Malingichthys) is known from China. The pholidophorids were historically united with several other stem-teleost lineages into the order Pholidophoriformes, but Pholidophoriformes in its traditional sense is now considered paraphyletic with respect to crown group teleosts.

== Phylogeny ==
Below is a cladogram simplified after Bean (2021):

- Teleosteomorpha
  - Pachycormidae
  - - Aspidorhynchidae
    - Teleostei
      - Archaeomaenidae
      - - Pholidophoridae
          - Annaichthys
          - - - Pholidophoretes
              - - Malingichthys
                - Pholidoctenus
            - - Parapholidophorus
              - - Pholidophorus
                - - Lombardichthys
                  - Pholidorhynchodon
        - - Prohalecites
          - - Eurycormus
            - - Ankylophoridae
              - - Ichthyokentema
                - - Dorsetichthys
                  - - Leptolepis
                    - - Ascalaboidae
                      - - Varasichthyidae
                        - Crown group Teleostei
