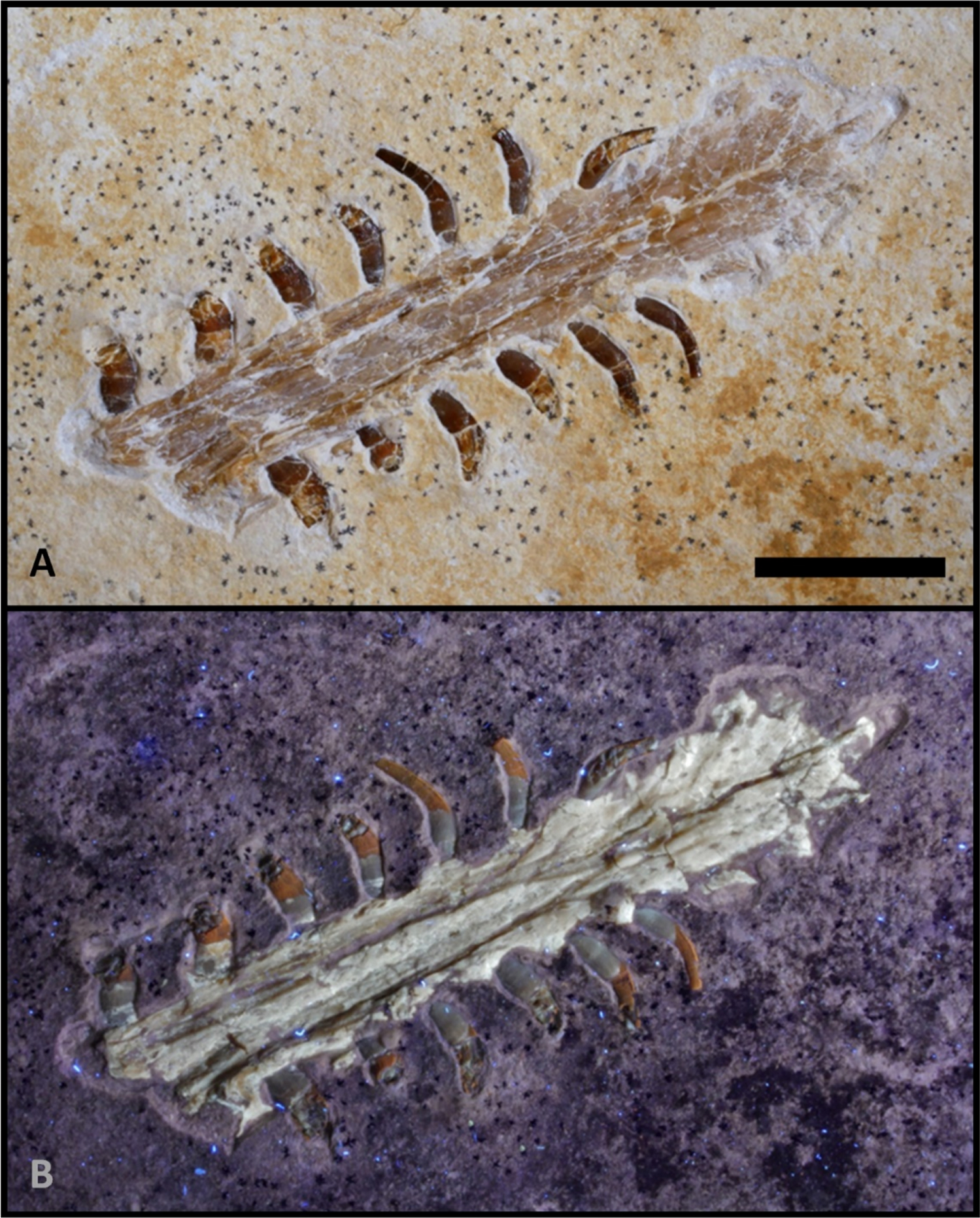
- Holotype rostrum under normal (A) and UV (B) light

Scientific classification
- Kingdom: Animalia
- Phylum: Chordata
- Class: Reptilia
- Order: †Pterosauria
- Suborder: †Pterodactyloidea
- Family: †Ctenochasmatidae
- Subfamily: †Gnathosaurinae
- Genus: †Spathagnathus; Fernandes et al., 2025

Type species
- †Spathagnathus roeperi Fernandes et al., 2025

= Spathagnathus =

Spathagnathus Temporal range: Late Jurassic (Late Kimmeridgian), 151 Ma

Genus of ctenochasmatid pterosaurs

Spathagnathus (meaning "spatula jaw") is a genus of ctenochasmatid pterosaur from the Late Jurassic Solnhofen Limestone of Germany. The type and only species is Spathagnathus roeperi, known from a single jawbone. It is the oldest known member of Gnathosaurinae, and the second pterosaur from the Solnhofen's Brunn quarry after the rhamphorhynchid Bellubrunnus. The unique dental anatomy of the taxon is thought to indicate a diet of tough, hard-shelled prey items.

== Discovery and naming ==
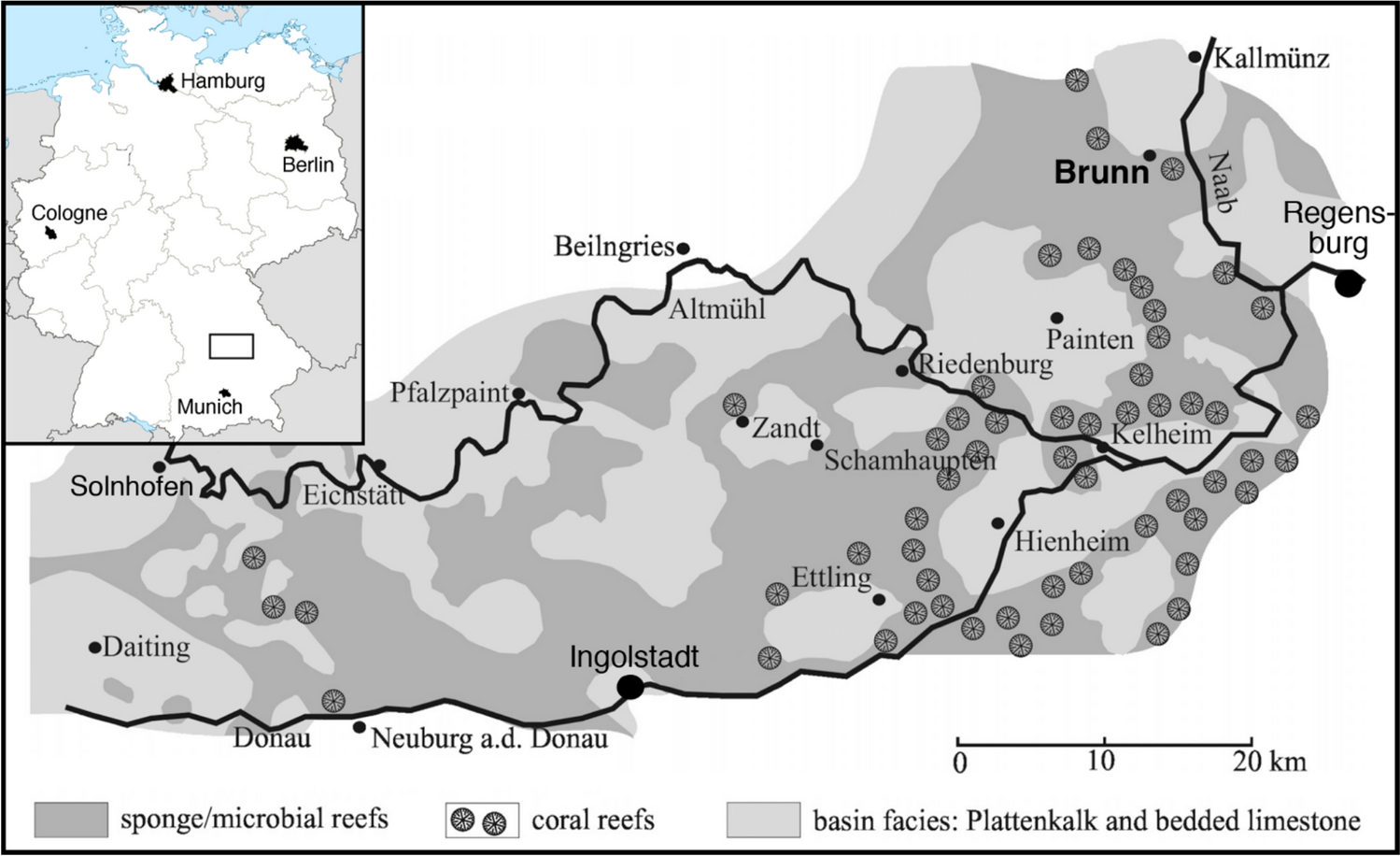
Solnhofen localities in Germany; Spathagnathus is known from Brunn

In 1993, Simone Kaulfuß, Maren Sendelbach and Andreas Heiner, students at the Schule für Präparationstechnische Assistenten in Bochum, in the chalk quarry of Brunn discovered a pterosaur snout. Starting in 1993, the quarry was systematically being excavated under the direction of Martin Röper and Monika Rothgaenger. Pterosaur finds were rare, with the exception of the type specimen of Bellubrunnus. The snout fossil was accessioned by the Bayerische Staatssammlung für Paläontologie und Geologie at Munich. After preparation, it was preliminarily described by Oliver Rauhut and colleagues in 2017. These authors concluded that the specimen represented a novel species, likely a member of the Gnathosaurinae, and that it would be named in a later publication.

In 2025, the type species Spathagnathus roeperi was named and described by Alexandra E. Fernandes, Helmut Tischlinger, Monika Rothgaenger and Oliver Walter Mischa Rauhut. The genus name is derived from Latin spatha, "spatula", in reference to the shape of the snout, and Greek gnathos, "jaw". The specific name honours the late Martin Röper, erstwhile director of the Bürgermeister-Müller-Museum at Solnhofen.

== Classification ==
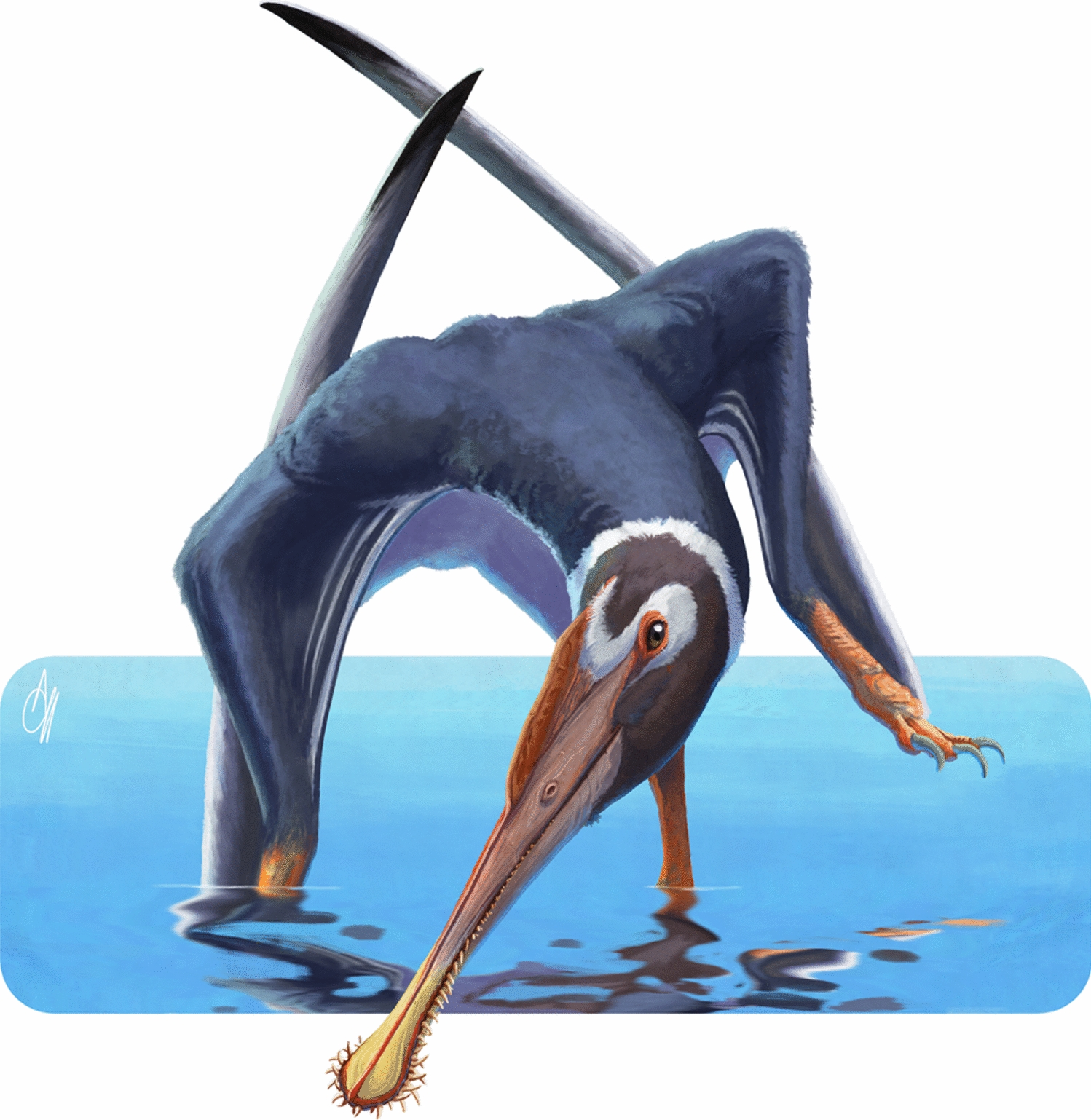
Speculative life restoration

In their phylogenetic analysis, Fernandes et al. recovered Spathagnathus as the sister taxon to the Uruguayan pterosaur Tacuadactylus within the ctenochasmatid subfamily Gnathosaurinae. These results are displayed in the cladogram below:

- Ctenochasmatidae
  - - Aurorazhdarcho
    - - - Ctenochasma elegans
        - Liaodactylus
      - - Pterodaustro
        - - Gegepterus
          - Beipiaopterus
  - - Kepodactylus
    - - Elanodactylus
      - - - Feilongus
          - Moganopterus
        - - Ardeadactylus
          - Gnathosaurinae
            - Huanhepterus
            - - Plataleorhynchus
              - - Lusognathus
                - - Gnathosaurus subulatus
                  - Gnathosaurus macrurus
                  - - Spathagnathus
                    - Tacuadactylus
