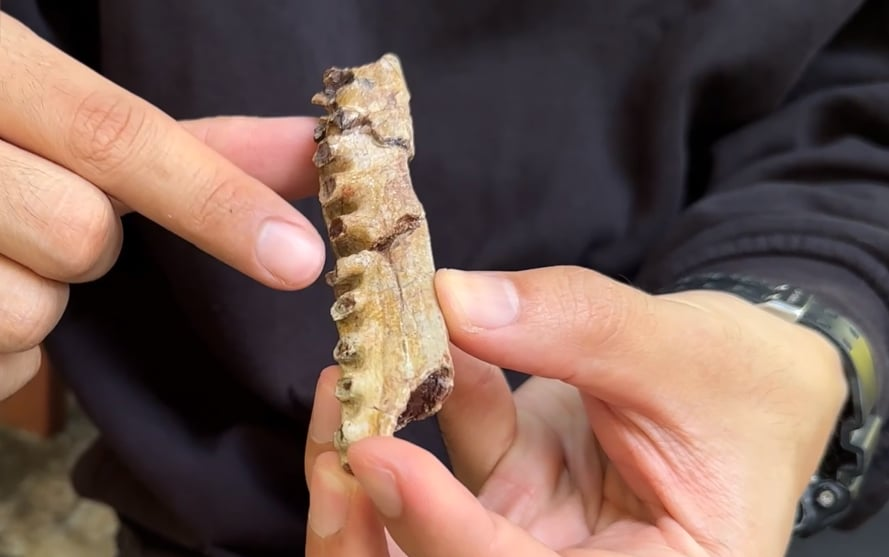
- Holotype jaw

Scientific classification
- Kingdom: Animalia
- Phylum: Chordata
- Class: Reptilia
- Order: †Pterosauria
- Suborder: †Pterodactyloidea
- Family: †Ctenochasmatidae
- Subfamily: †Gnathosaurinae
- Genus: †Garudapterus; Manitkoon et al., 2025

Type species
- †Garudapterus buffetauti Manitkoon et al., 2025

= Garudapterus =

Garudapterus Temporal range: Early Cretaceous, (Hauterivian–Barremian)

Genus of ctenochasmatid pterosaurs

Garudapterus (meaning "Garuda wing") is a genus of ctenochasmatid pterosaur that lived during the Early Cretaceous in what is now Thailand. The type and only species is G. buffetauti, named after the palaeontologist Éric Buffetaut for his longstanding contributions to Thai palaeontology. Garudapterus is known from a partial rostrum and associated tooth fragments discovered in 2023 and named in 2025, making it the first pterosaur species to be named from South-East Asia. It belonged to the gnathosaurine lineage of pterosaurs, possessing a spatulate rostrum and elongate teeth, and is distinguished by the keeled shape and diamond-shaped tip of its jaw. Preserved in an ancient river channel at the Phra Pong locality in rocks of the Khorat Group, it would have lived in a freshwater floodplain ecosystem amongst dinosaurs and other Early Cretaceous animals.

== Discovery and naming ==
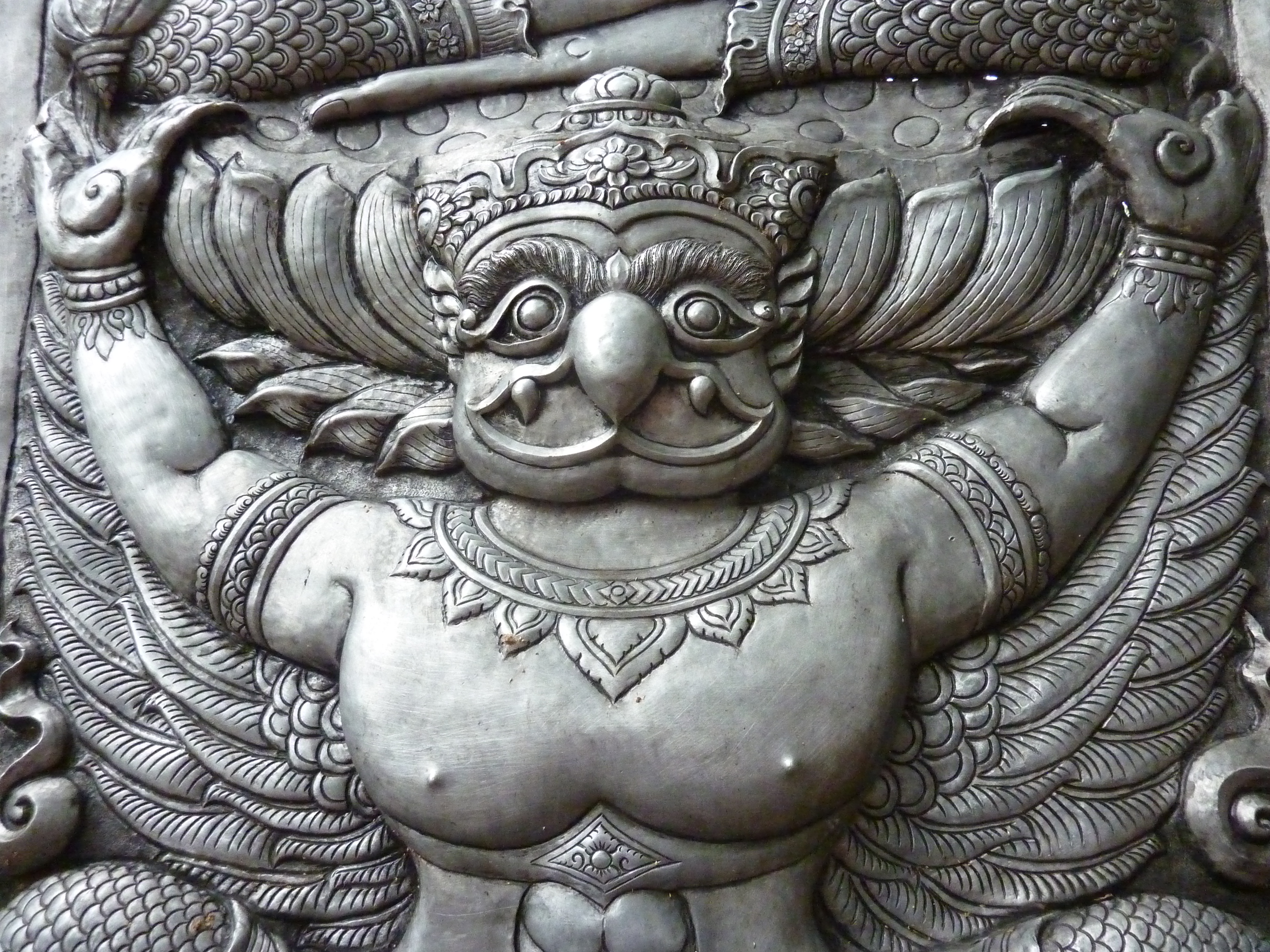
Garuda, namesake of the genus

The Phra Prong geologic locality in the Phanom Dong Rak mountain range of Sa Kaeo Province, Eastern Thailand first attracted interest for its fossils in 2002, when the remains of sauropod dinosaurs were reported from the site. Since then, various other vertebrate remains have been discovered from the site. In 2023, part of the skull of a pterosaur was discovered alongside five teeth. It constituted the first skull remains of a pterosaur from Thailand, which had previously only yielded various body fossils. The locality is not assigned to any specific geological formation, but it is thought to be equivalent in age to the rocks of the Sao Khua Formation; both are part of the larger Khorat Group. An earlier 2019 study described a similar tooth from the Sao Khua Formation itself.

In 2025, this specimen was described by Sita Manitkoon and colleagues in the journal Cretaceous Research and named as the new taxon Garudapterus buffetauti. It is the first pterosaur to be named both from Thailand and South-East Asia as a whole, and was thus noted for its biogeographic importance. The specimen is catalogued in the collections of the Palaeontological Research and Education Centre at Mahasarakham University as PRC 185-190, and consists of a portion of the rostrum that includes the third through thirteenth tooth sockets, as well as five associated partial teeth. The generic name is derived from Garuda, a divine bird in Hindu and Buddhist faith, and pteron—the Latinized Greek word for "wing"—a common suffix for pterosaur names. The specific name honours Éric Buffetaut, a French palaeontologist, for his longstanding role in collaborative palaeontological work between France and Thailand.

== Description ==
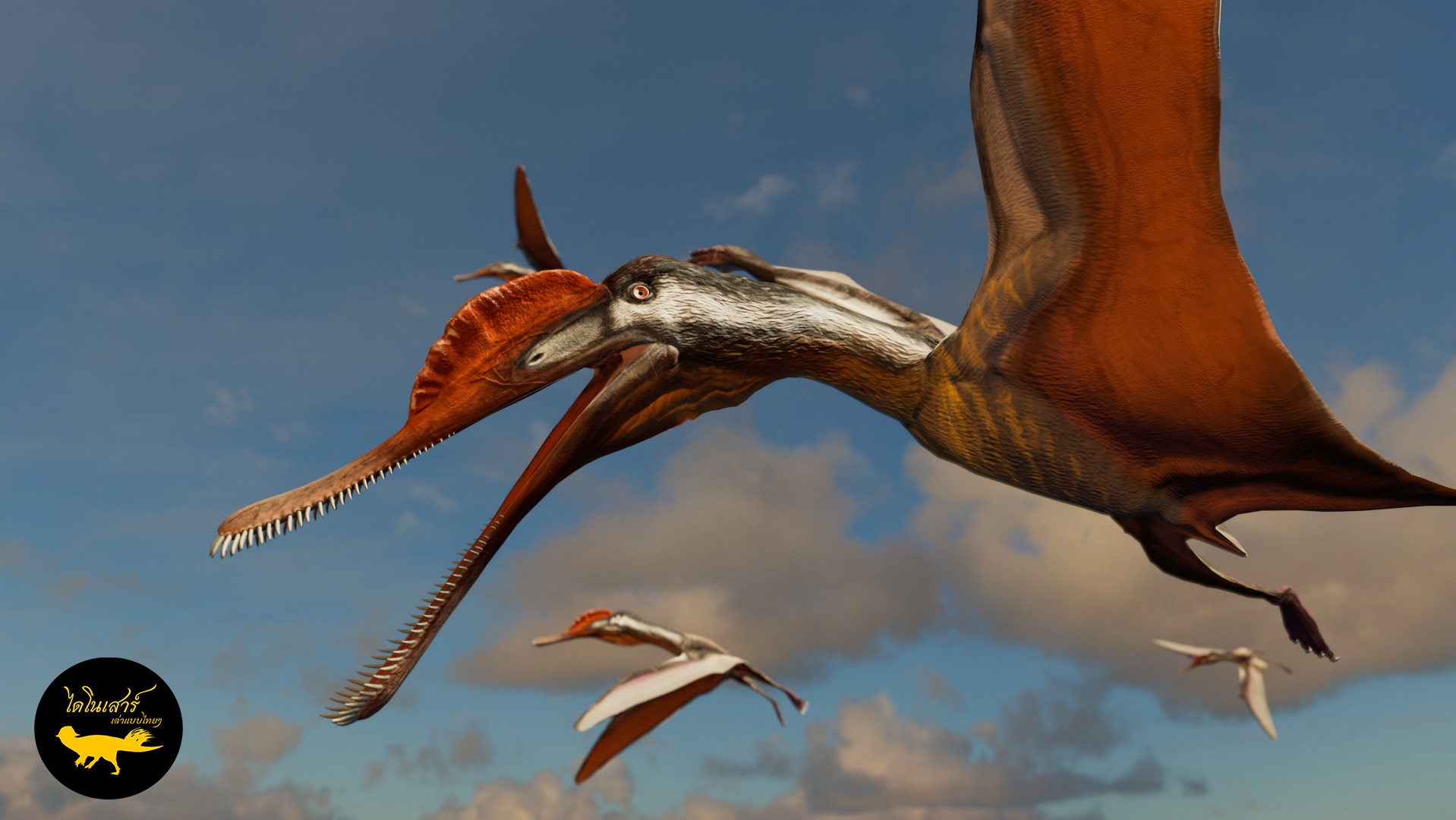
Speculative life restoration

As a gnathosaurine pterosaur, Garudapterus was a flying animal with an elongate snout ending in a spatula-like jaw tip with protruding tooth sockets holding many long teeth. The presence of two distinctive groves along its palate is a key trait identifying it as a member of the group. Compared to other gnathosaurines, it is distinguished by the shape of its snout; whereas all other species possess flattened rostrums, that of Garudapterus is keeled, forming a triangular cross-section with a raised center. The shape of the spatulate snout tip is also unique; it is widest in the middle, creating a diamond shape, rather than being rounded as in Plataleorhynchus or widest at the tip as in Gnathosaurus and Tacuadactylus.

The tooth sockets are oriented towards the side of the snout, similar to the gnathosaurine Lusognathus but contrasting with the forwardly-projecting teeth of other relatives. They gradually orient downwards as they proceed towards the back of the snout, unlike Lusognathus and instead resembling the condition seen in Gnathosaurus. The sockets are slightly elliptical, being wider than tall, as are the teeth, which are more extremely oval in shape, also unlike the more circular teeth of Lusognathus. Each tooth possesses smooth enamel, similar to Lusognathus and unlike the ornamented surface seen in Tacuadactylus.

== Classification ==
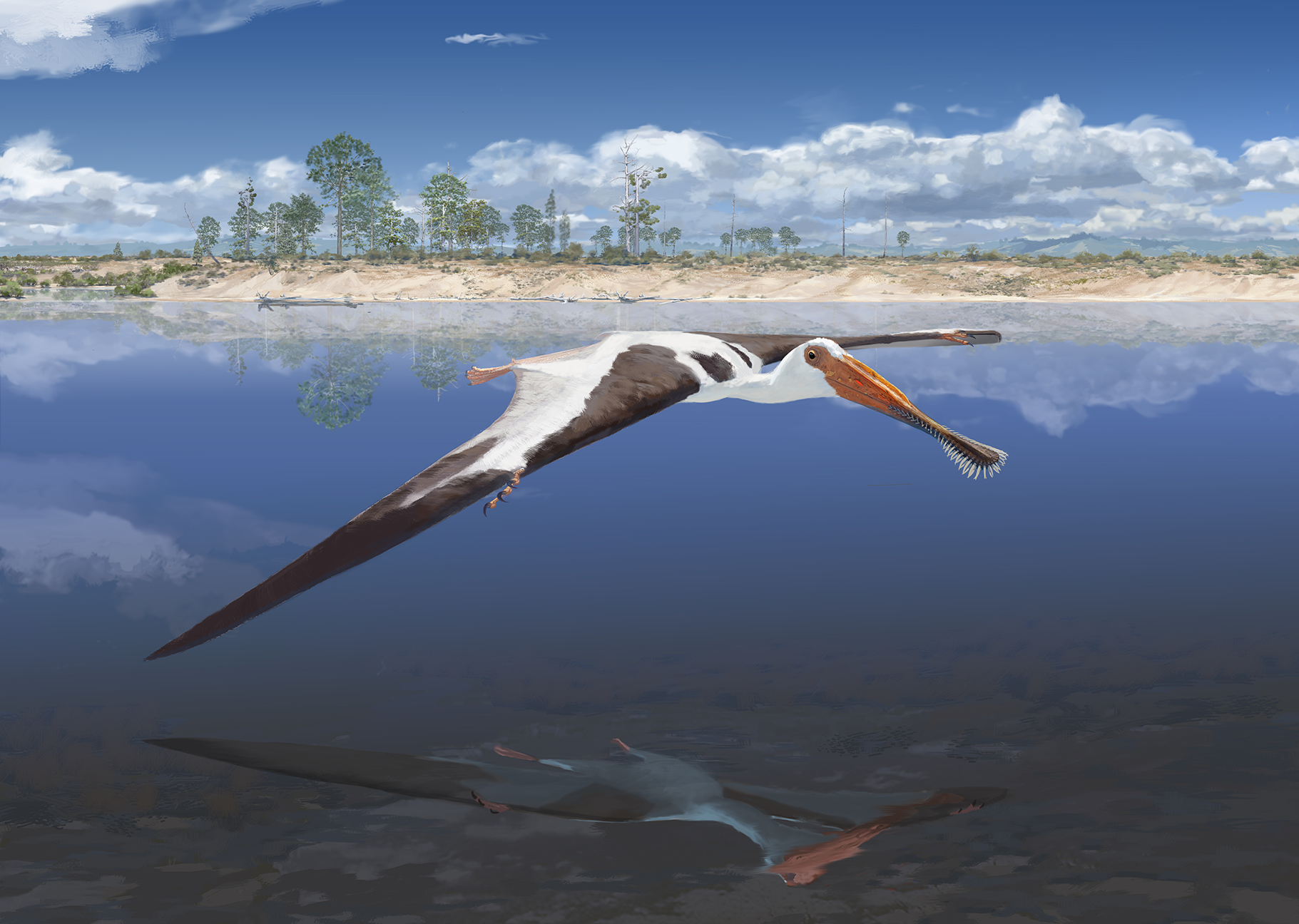
Life restoration of Lusognathus, thought to be a very close relative

In their 2025 description of Garudapterus, Manitkoon and colleagues performed a phylogenetic analysis based on a matrix modified from a 2024 study by Rubi V. Pêgas, a coauthor of the Garudapterus description. Their analyses found the genus to be nested within the ctenochasmatid group Gnathosaurinae, which is also supported by the anatomy of the fossil. Specifically, it was found to be most closely related to Lusognathus from Portugal, which shares its laterally-oriented tooth sockets. The results of their phylogenetic analysis are seen in the cladogram below:

- Ctenochasmatidae
  - - - Huanhepterus
      - - Aurorazhdarcho
        - Ardeadactylus
    - - - Elanodactylus
        - Forfexopterus
      - - Gladocephaloideus
        - - Feilongus
          - Moganopterus
  - - - Liaodactylus
      - - Pterofiltrus
        - Cathayopterus
    - - Gnathosaurinae
        - Plataleorhynchus
        - - - Lusognathus
            - Garudapterus
          - - Gnathosaurus
            - Tacuadactylus
      - - - Pterodaustro
          - - Gegepterus
            - Beipiaopterus
        - Ctenochasma

== Palaeoecology ==
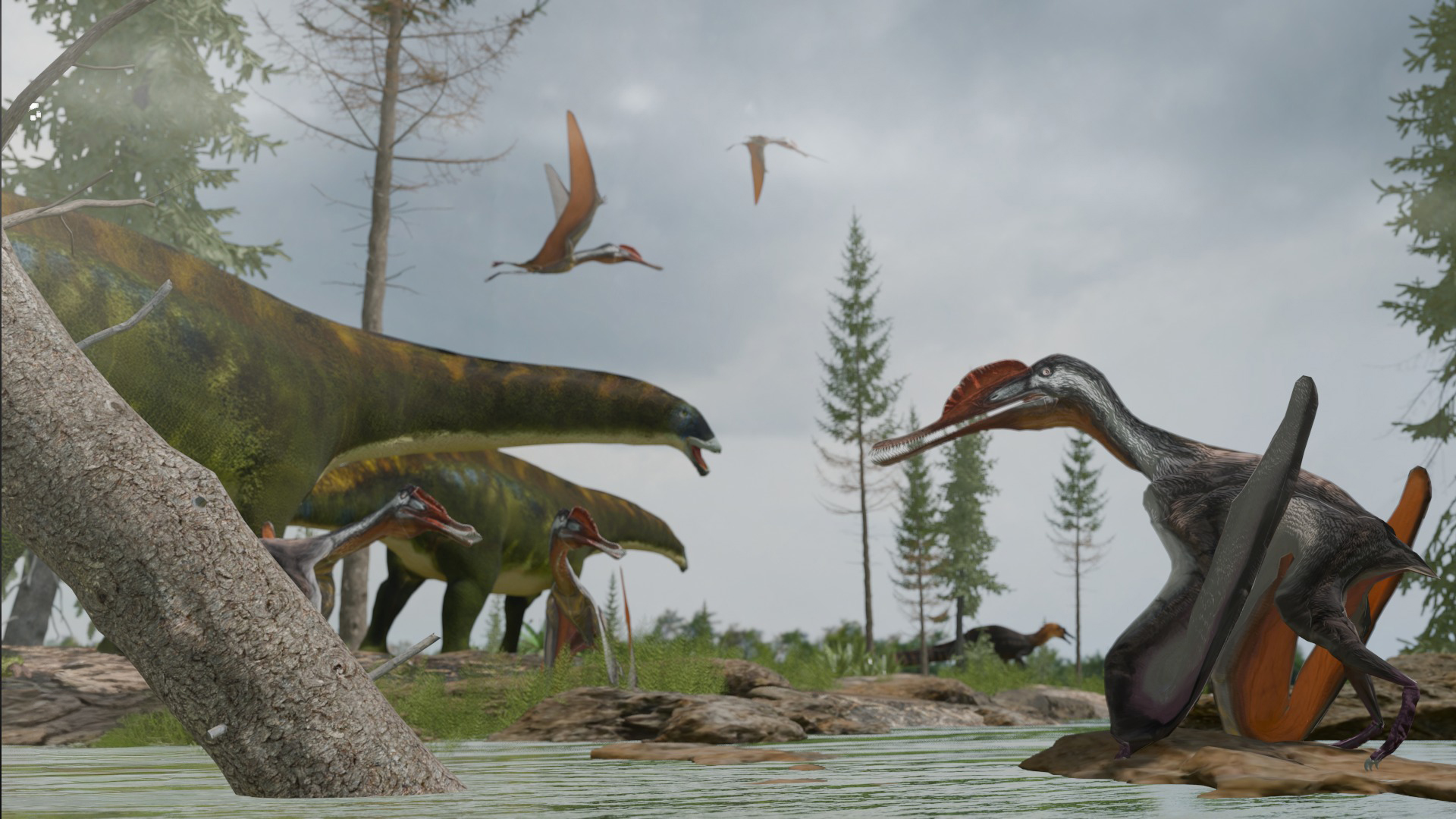
Environment reconstruction of the fauna and flora of the Phra Prong locality, including Garudapterus

Garudapterus fossils are known from the Phra Prong locality of the Khorat Group. This locality consists of three layers of interbedded sandstone and siltstone, with fossils found in the sandstone-dominated upper region of the second layer. Geologic study of the locality has been limited, but bivalve index fossils indicate that it likely dates to the Hauterivian or Barremian age of the Early Cretaceous period. In particular, the locality is tentatively considered equivalent in age to the nearby Sao Khua Formation, known for its dinosaurs and other vertebrate fossils. The site where the Garudapterus holotype specimen was preserved was likely a slowly-flowing water channel, part of a larger high-energy current in an inland floodplain ecosystem. Remains of several other animals have been recovered from the site, including those of sauropod, spinosaurid and allosauroid dinosaurs, freshwater hybodonts (shark-like animals), actinopterygian fish, crocodyliform reptiles, and trionychoid, carettochelyid, and adocid turtles. Each is known from fragmentary or isolated remains, especially teeth, and thus no specific genera or species that lived alongside Garudapterus can be identified.
