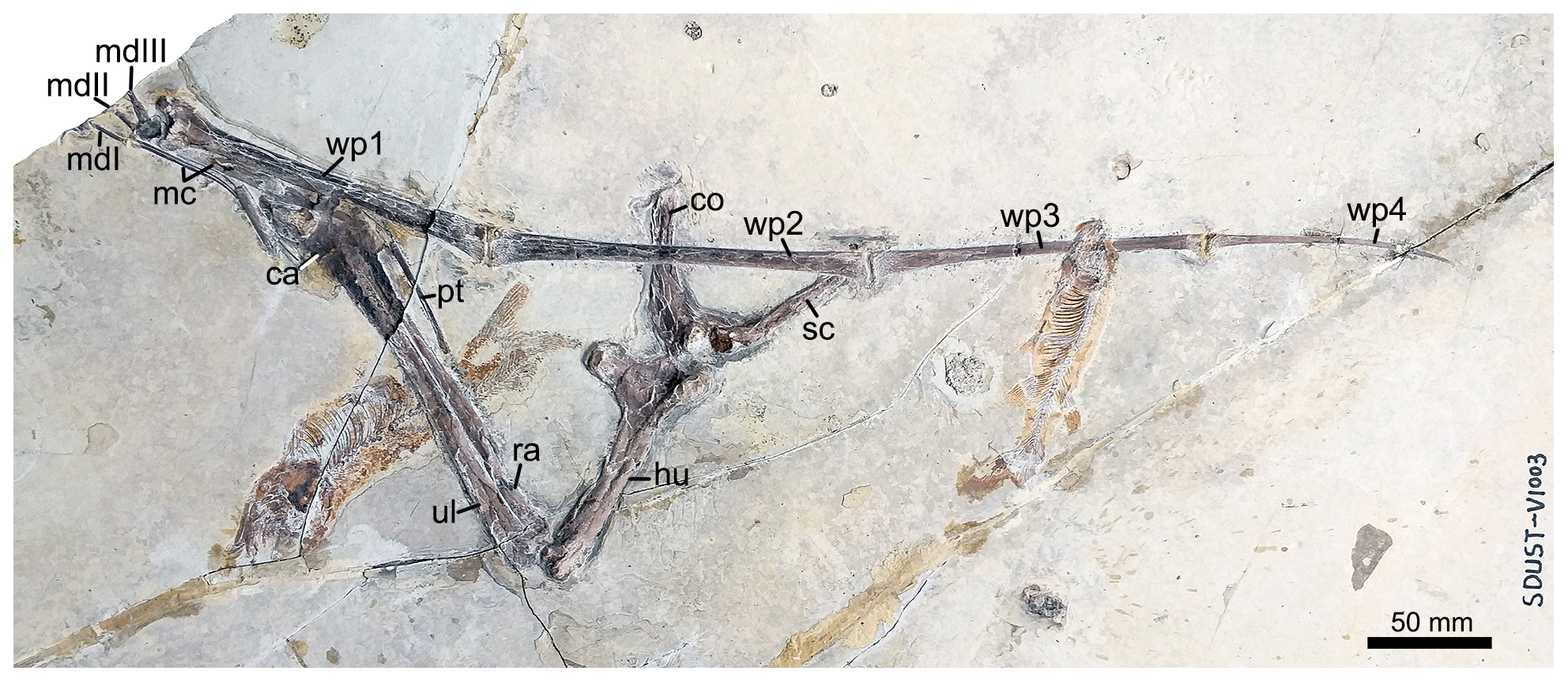
- Second specimen of Forfexopterus (SDUST V1003)

Scientific classification
- Kingdom: Animalia
- Phylum: Chordata
- Class: Reptilia
- Order: †Pterosauria
- Suborder: †Pterodactyloidea
- Family: †Ctenochasmatidae
- Genus: †Forfexopterus; Jiang et al., 2016
- Species: †F. jeholensis

Binomial name
- †Forfexopterus jeholensis Jiang et al., 2016

= Forfexopterus =

Forfexopterus Temporal range: Aptian, 121–119 Ma

Genus of ctenochasmatid pterosaur from the Early Cretaceous

Forfexopterus (meaning "scissor wings") is a genus of ctenochasmatid pterosaur from the Early Cretaceous Jiufotang Formation in China. It contains a single species, F. jeholensis, named from a mostly complete skeleton by Shunxing Jiang and colleagues in 2016. A second specimen, consisting of a wing, was described in 2020. While the first specimen is larger, it shows signs of being less mature than the second specimen, indicating that the developmental trajectories of Forfexopterus were variable. Like other ctenochasmatids, Forfexopterus had a long, low skull filled with many slender teeth; unlike other members of the group, however, it did not have a spatula-shaped snout tip or crests, and its teeth were more curved. A single characteristic distinguishes Forfexopterus from all other members of the wider group Archaeopterodactyloidea: of the four phalanx bones in its wing finger, the first was shorter than the second but longer than the third.

== Discovery and naming ==
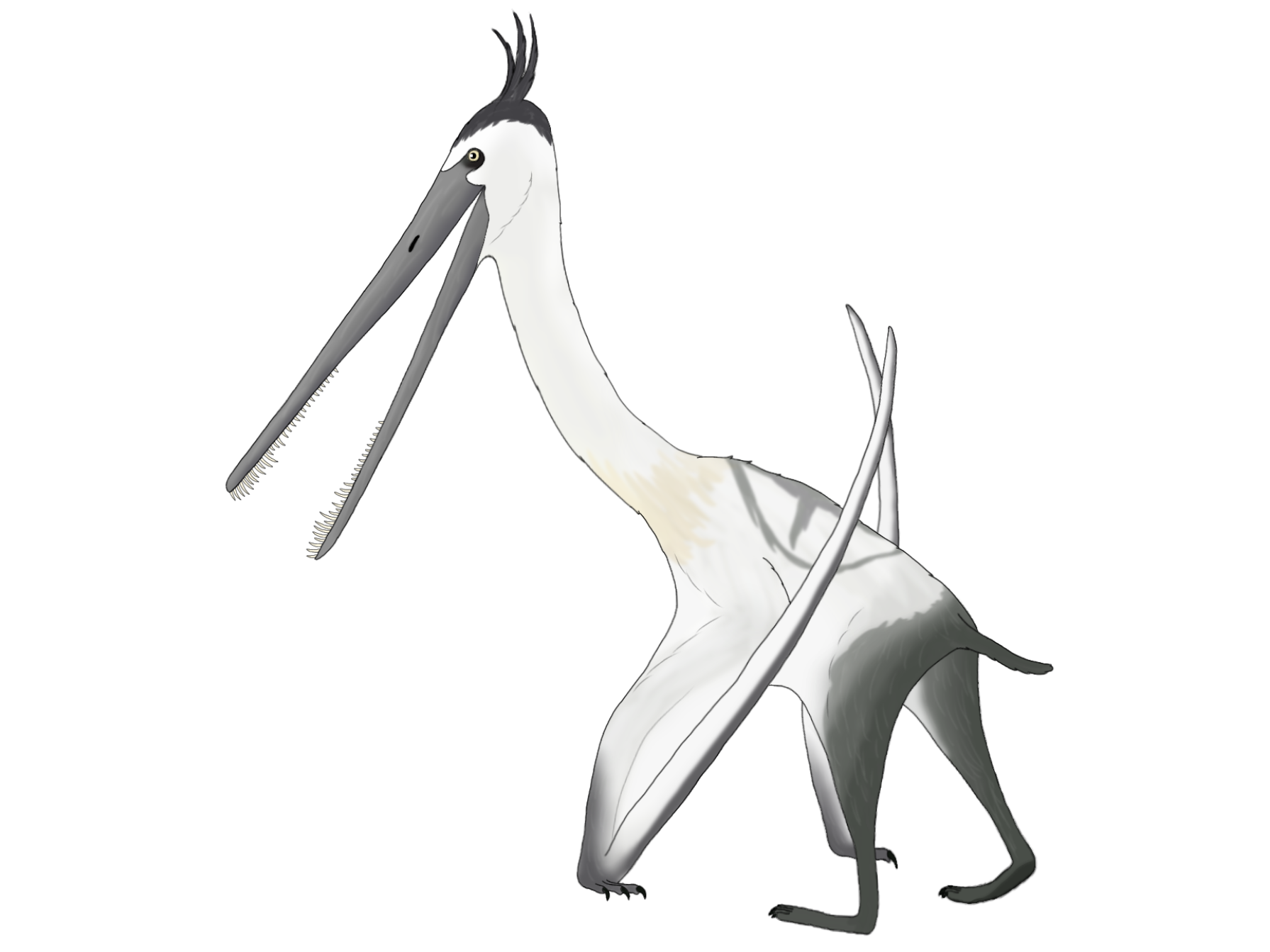
Life reconstruction of Forfexopterus

The holotype specimen of Forfexopterus was discovered by a local farmer, who had partially damaged this specimen while attempting to remove the encasing rock; the specimen was later restored. The specimen, which has the number HM (Hami Museum) V20, represents a single individual, and consists of a mostly complete skeleton including the skull but missing most of the vertebral column. It was discovered in rocks belonging to the Jiufotang Formation, dating to approximately 120 million years ago (the Aptian age), in the Xiaotaizi locality near Lamadong Town, Jianchang County, Liaoning, China. It was described in 2016 by Shunxing Jiang and colleagues.

In 2020, the second specimen SDUST (Shandong University of Science and Technology) V1003 was described by Chang-Fu Zhou and colleagues; it consists of an articulated right wing. It came from the Xiaoyaogou site, which is 3.5 kilometres (2.2 mi) southeast of Xiaotaizi. While all of the preserved bones have been exposed, the long fourth metacarpal of the wing is broken in two places, and parts of the second and third digits are missing. Like the holotype, it was damaged during excavation, with some anatomical details of the ulna, radius, carpals, and pteroid (a wing bone exclusively found in pterosaurs) being indiscernable. In 2022, the third specimen SDUST V1007 was described by Zhou and colleagues. It consists of the tip of the lower law, and was found at the Dayaogou site in Jianchang County.

The generic name Forfexopterus is derived from Latin forfex ("scissors") and Greek pterus ("wings"), and refers to the scissor-like shape of the jaws; the specific name jeholensis refers to the Jehol region.

== Description ==
Size of Forfexopterus specimens compared to a human

Forfexopterus would have been large for an archaeopterodactyloid pterosaur. In 2016, Jiang and colleagues estimated the wingspan of HM V20 at 3 metres (9.8 ft); in 2020, Zhou and colleagues revised this to 2.37 metres (7 ft 9 in) by doubling the length of the wing. A similar methodology yielded 1.78 metres (5 ft 10 in) for SDUST V1003. Despite being the larger specimen, HM V20 was only a subadult, while the smaller SDUST V1003 was an adult. The former has unfused bones that are typically fused in adult pterosaurs: the atlas and axis, the first two neck vertebrae; the scapula and coracoid in the shoulder; the epiphysis (lower end) of the humerus to its shaft; and the attachment of the extensor tendon to the first phalanx bone of the wing finger, whereas these are all fused in the latter. This discrepancy is suggestive of developmental variation in the genus, and may be both connected to and independent of sexual dimorphism as in other pterosaurs such as Pteranodon; however, insufficient fossil evidence exists to assess this.

=== Skull and vertebrae ===
Illustration of the Forfexopterus holotype skull fossil material and reconstructed skull

The skull was low and long, measuring 51 centimetres (20 in) in length. The tip of the upper jaw was not expanded into a spatulate shape, unlike Gnathosaurus, Huanhepterus, and Plataleorhynchus. Unlike Feilongus and Moganopterus, it appears that no crest was present on either jaw. Both jaws were filled by slender, smooth-surfaced teeth that pointed outwards like other ctenochasmatids, with an estimated 30 and 28 teeth on each side of the upper and lower jaws. However, the teeth of Forfexopterus were more curved than other ctenochasmatids, and they were also less dense than contemporary ctenochasmatids (with a tooth density of 2.2 per centimetre (5.6/in) in the lower jaw). The teeth were restricted to the front third of the jaw, before the nasoantorbital fenestra that housed the nostrils, which was similar to Huanhepterus, Cathayopterus, and Gegepterus. These characteristics are part of a unique combination of features that distinguishes Forfexopterus. While Pterofiltrus had a similar number of teeth, they occupied more of the jaws. The tip of the lower jaw had a short midline projection at the front, which is also seen in Pangupterus and Liaodactylus; a similar process is known as the odontoid process in the Istiodactylidae, but unlike in istiodactylids the process of Forfexopterus was probably too short to have had a cutting function.

In the neck, the axis (second neck vertebra) was short and had a low neural spine on top, like Moganopterus. However, the fifth neck vertebra was less elongated than Moganopterus or Huanhepterus and was closer to the typical condition of other archaeopterodactyloids (being 4.7 times as long as it was wide). Ribs are associated with the fifth neck vertebra as in Beipiaopterus and Gegepterus, but the sixth and seventh lack them. Unlike the Boreopteridae, these vertebrae had relatively low neural spines as well.

=== Limbs and limb girdles ===
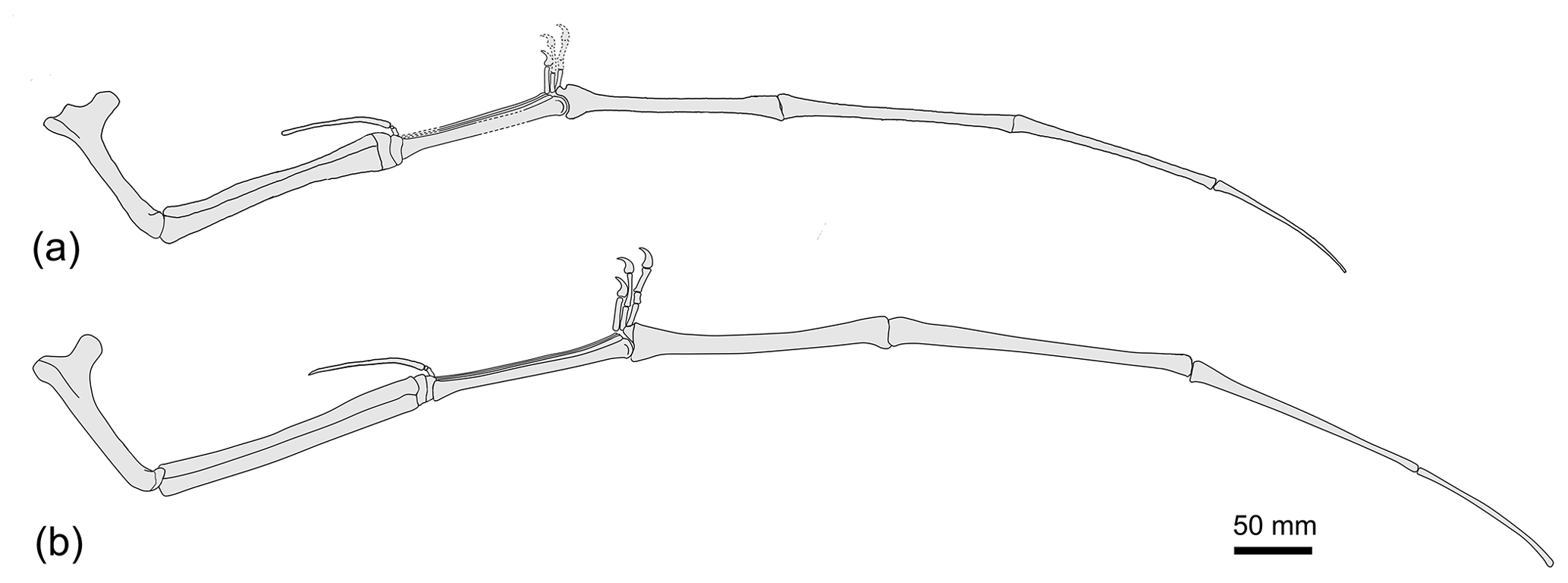
Comparison of reconstructed wings of (a) SDUST V1003 and (b) HM V20

In the shoulder girdle, a number of characteristics contributed to a unique combination of features: a pointed projection on the sternum known as the cristospine was long; the location where the coracoids attached to the sternum, located on either side of a midline ridge on the cristospine, was further forward on the right side than the left; and the coracoid bears a weakly-developed flange (also known in Beipiaopterus, Gegepterus, and Elanodactylus, although also variably present in the Azhdarchoidea). HM V20 in particular was the first archaeopterodactyloid specimen that preserved the articulation of the sternum with the coracoid. Like Beipiaopterus, Elanodactylus, and Zhenyuanopterus, the scapula was longer than the coracoid. Unlike Gegepterus, the back of the sternum was curved in Forfexopterus.

In the arm, the humerus had a well-developed deltopectoral crest that was only a quarter of the shaft's length like Beipiaopterus and Zhenyuanopterus. At the bottom of the crest, HM V20 had an opening (pneumatic foramen), also seen in Elanodactylus and Boreopterus, but the condition in SDUST V1003 is unclear. Unlike contemporary archaeopterodactyloids, the ulna was proportionally long compared to the humerus (being 63% longer in HM V20 and 48% longer in SDUST V1003). The ulna was slightly thicker than the radius, like Beipiaopterus and Huanhepterus, while it was up to twice as thick in other archaeopterodactyloids. For the slender, pointed pteroid, the ratio of its length was similar to the Boreopteridae (46.7% in HM V20, 47.3% in SDUST V1003). Forfexopterus is unique among archaeopterodactyloids in that the first phalanx bone of its wing finger was shorter than the second but longer than the third; Elanodactylus was similar, except the first was shorter than the third. The first three wing phalanges were straight, while the fourth phalanx was curved with an expanded (not pointed) end like Elanopterus and Gegepterus. All three of the free digits were tipped with large, curved claws bearing prominent tubercles for muscle attachment, with the first digit being shortest and the third being longest.

As in Elanodactylus and Huanhepterus, the head of the femur had a constricted neck and a flat articulating surface. Like most other archaeopterodactyloids, the tibia was longer than the femur. Relative to Beipiaopterus and Gegepterus, the fibula was short compared to the tibia at 40% of its length, but the third metatarsal bone was similar at 37.1% of its length. Compared to the hand, the claws on the five toes of Forfexopterus were relatively small. Some authors have suggested that the foot structure of Forfexopterus and other filter feeding ctenochasmatids—with long metatarsals and small digits—may have been an adaptation to improve the ability to wade in water.

== Classification ==
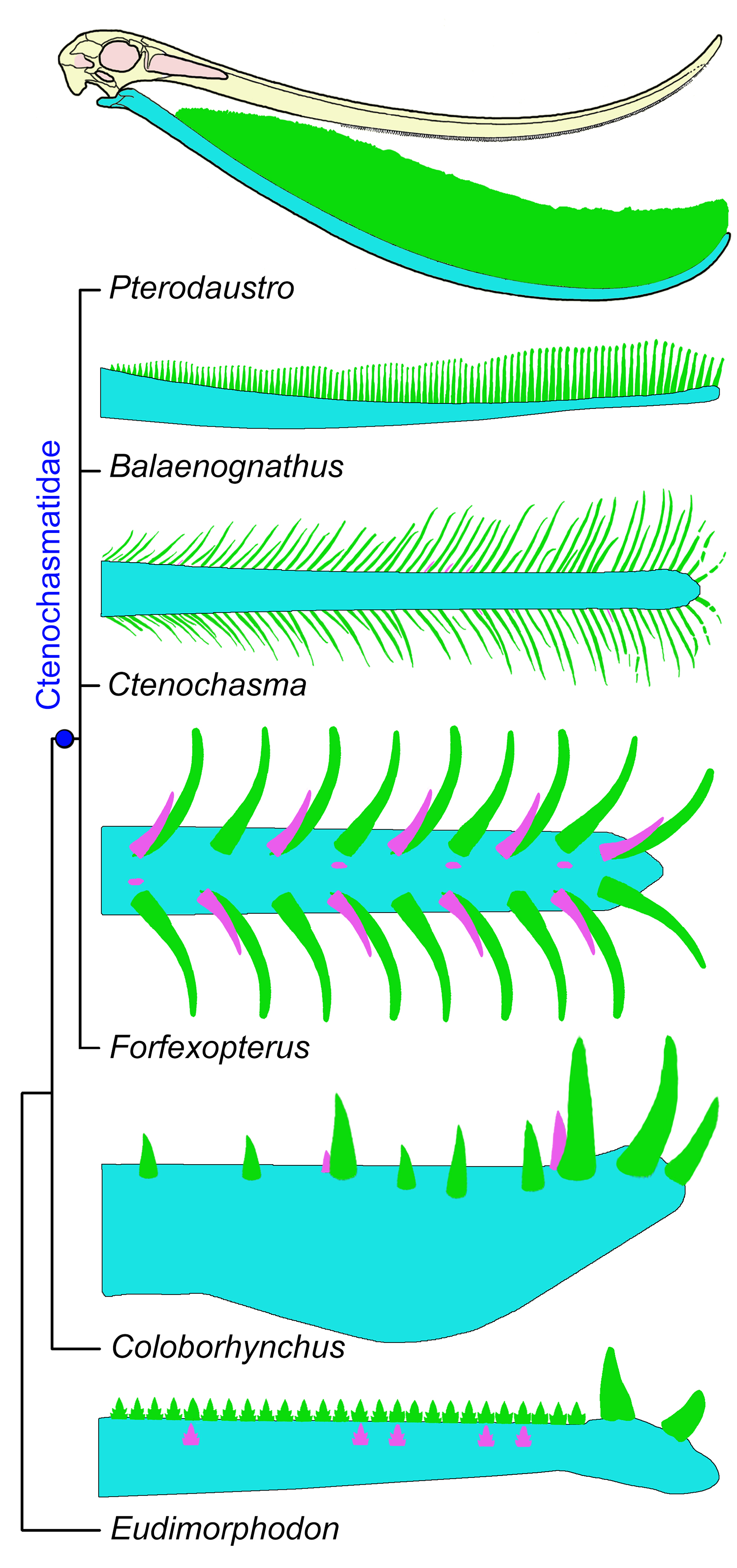
Dental anatomy of Forfexopterus compared to other ctenochasmatids and more distant pterosaurs, with replacement teeth in purple, functional teeth in green

Jiang and colleagues determined that Forfexopterus was a member of the Archaeopterodactyloidea, on account of the long fourth (wing) metacarpal and the reduced fifth metatarsal in the foot. They tentatively assigned it to the Ctenochasmatidae based on the long snout, the presence of more than 100 teeth, the third metatarsal of the foot being longer than a third of the tibia, and the presence of projections called exapophyses on the vertebrae. This attribution was followed by Zhou and colleagues, as well as other authors in their assessments of ctenochasmatid specimens. In 2023, Jiang and colleagues noted proportional similarities between Forfexopterus, Elanodactylus, Eosipterus, and their new taxon Cratonopterus, which they used to affirm its position within the Ctenochasmatidae. Pêgas (2024) included Forfexopterus in a phylogenetic analysis of the Pterosauria and found support for similar relationships, with Forfexopterus and Elanodactylus as sister taxa within the Ctenochasmatoidea. These results are displayed in the cladogram below:

- - - - Aurorazhdarcho
      - - Ardeadactylus
        - Huanhepterus
    - - - Elanodactylus
        - Forfexopterus
      - - Gladocephaloideus
        - - Feilongus
          - Moganopterus
  - - - Liaodactylus
      - - Pterofiltrus
        - Cathayopterus
    - - - Plataleorhynchus
        - - Lusognathus
          - - Gnathosaurus
            - Tacuadactylus
      - - Ctenochasma spp.
        - - Pterodaustro
          - - Gegepterus
            - Beipiaopterus

== Palaeobiology ==
=== Tooth wear and replacement ===
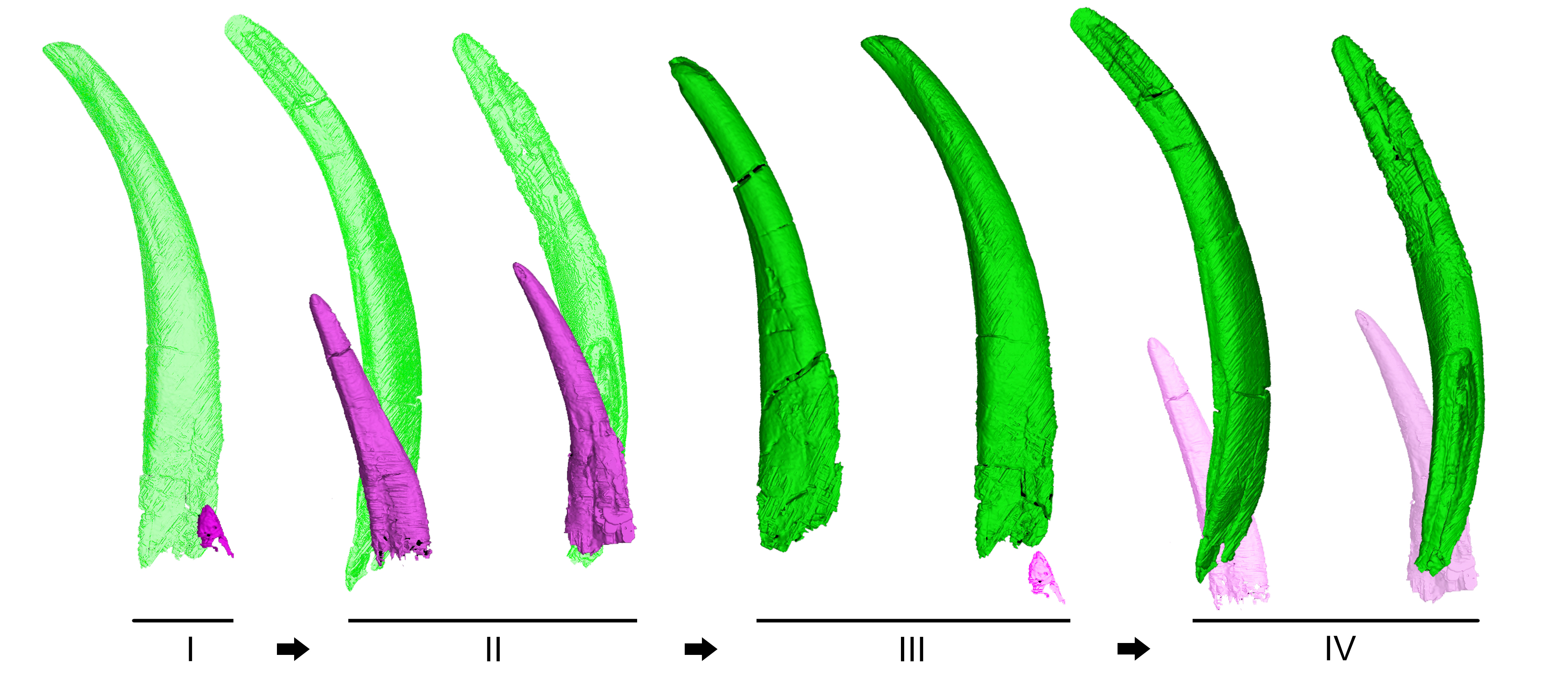
Four-stage progression of tooth replacement in Forfexopterus, with replacement teeth in purple and functional teeth in green

The teeth of the Forfexopterus lower jaw specimen SDUST V1007 showed signs of abrasion near the tip of the crown, with the teeth having wear facets on the outer (labial), inner (lingual), or both surfaces. The facets on the outer surfaces tended to be relatively low-angled, and were only present on more heavily-worn teeth. By contrast, the facets on the inner surfaces were higher-angled and were present on most of the teeth, implying that this type of tooth abrasion began earlier in life. Such wear facets arise from regular contact (occlusion) between teeth in the upper and lower jaws. However, this contact only results in facets on the outer surfaces of the lower teeth and on the inner surfaces of the upper teeth.

In 2022, Zhou and colleagues suggested that the unique wear pattern of SDUST V1007 was related to the pattern of tooth replacement in Forfexopterus. This specimen preserves nine replacement teeth on the lower jaw, which were sharp and pointed. They grew on the insides of the functional teeth to about a third of their length. If a similar pattern of tooth replacement existed in the upper jaw, this would suggest that the wear facets on the inner surfaces of the lower teeth were made by the older functional tooth, while the wear facets on the outer surfaces of the lower teeth were made by their replacement teeth. Zhou and colleagues indicated that this pattern could only occur when the teeth pointed outwards horizontally, as was the case in Forfexopterus and other ctenochasmatids.

Ctenochasmatid teeth vary in shape and arrangement, from the needle-like, closely-packed teeth of Pterodaustro and Ctenochasma (adapted for eating planktonic prey) to the wider-spaced teeth of Gnathosaurus and Plataleorhynchus arranged in spoonbills (adapted for eating larger prey). Biomechanical research indicates that these specialized forms had very weak bite forces. Compared to these forms, Forfexopterus, Feilongus, and Moganopterus had short tooth rows and widely-spaced teeth, but also lacked spoonbill-shaped snouts. Combined with the wear facets of Forfexopterus, Zhou and colleagues suggested that this was indicative of a relatively active feeding strategy.

== Palaeoecology ==
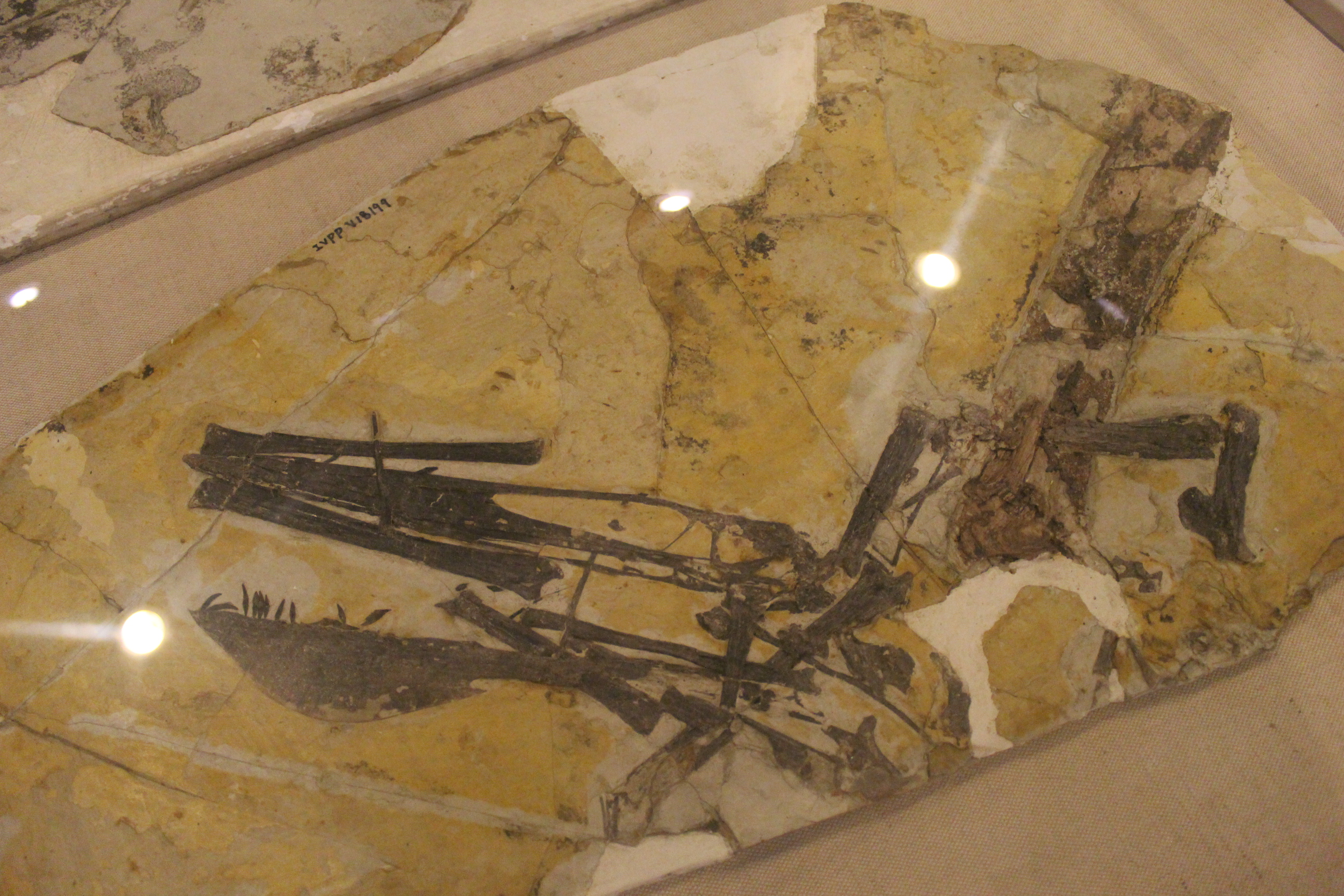
Holotype specimen of Ikrandraco, a contemporary of Forfexopterus

The Jiufotang Formation in the Lamadong area consists of lake deposits, with at least SDUST V1003 having been discovered in such deposits. In particular, fish similar to Jinanichthys and freshwater snails similar to Galba were found on the same slab as SDUST V1003. Other pterosaurs from these deposits include the ctenochasmatid Moganopterus, the lonchodectid Ikrandraco, and the anurognathid Vesperopterylus. Pterosaurs known from other deposits of the Jiufotang Formation include the ctenochasmatids Feilongus, Gladocephaloideus, and Pangupterus; the anhanguerians Guidraco, Liaoningopterus, and Linlongopterus; the chaoyangopterids Chaoyangopterus, Eoazhdarcho, Jidapterus, and Shenzhoupterus; the istiodactylids Istiodactylus, Liaoxipterus, Lingyuanopterus, Nurhachius, and possibly Hongshanopterus; and the tapejarid Sinopterus, for a total of 23 pterosaur species from the formation as of 2016.

Other animals known from the same beds as Forfexopterus include the ornithuromorph birds Mengciusornis and Zhongjianornis; the enantiornithine birds Fortunguavis and Bohaiornis; the turtles Liaochelys and Perochelys; the lizard Yabeinosaurus; the choristoderan Philydrosaurus; the mammal Liaoconodon, and the cynodont Fossiomanus.
