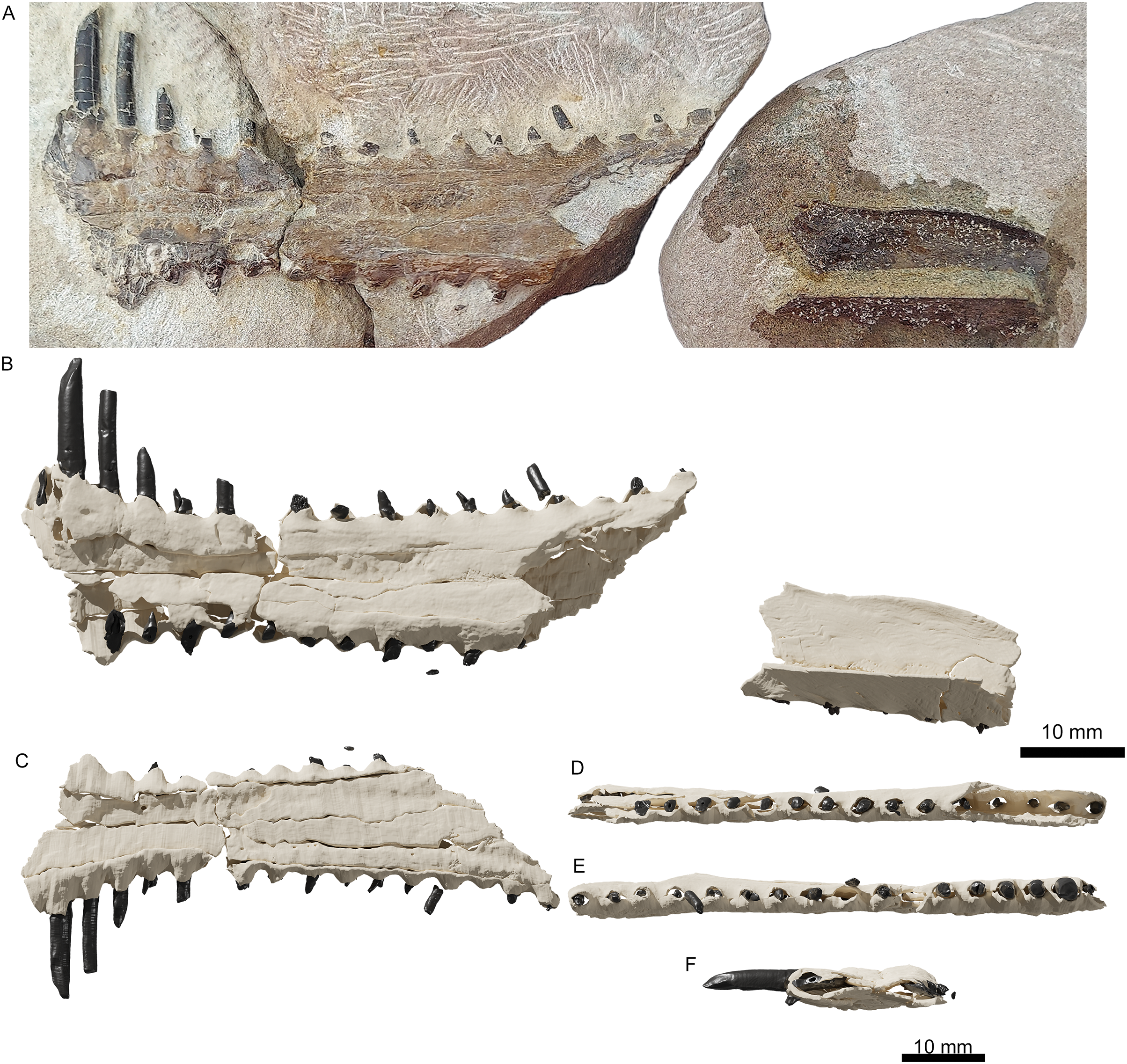
- Holotype upper jaw

Scientific classification
- Kingdom: Animalia
- Phylum: Chordata
- Class: Reptilia
- Order: †Pterosauria
- Suborder: †Pterodactyloidea
- Family: †Ctenochasmatidae
- Genus: †Lusognathus; Fernandes et al., 2023
- Species: †L. almadrava

Binomial name
- †Lusognathus almadrava Fernandes et al., 2023

= Lusognathus =

Lusognathus Temporal range: Late Jurassic (late Kimmeridgian–early Tithonian)

Genus of ctenochasmatid pterosaurs

Lusognathus (meaning "Lusitanian jaw") is an extinct genus of gnathosaurine pterosaurs from the Late Jurassic Lourinhã Formation of Portugal. The genus contains a single species, Lusognathus almadrava, known from a parts of the upper jaw, teeth, and cervical vertebrae.

== Discovery and naming ==
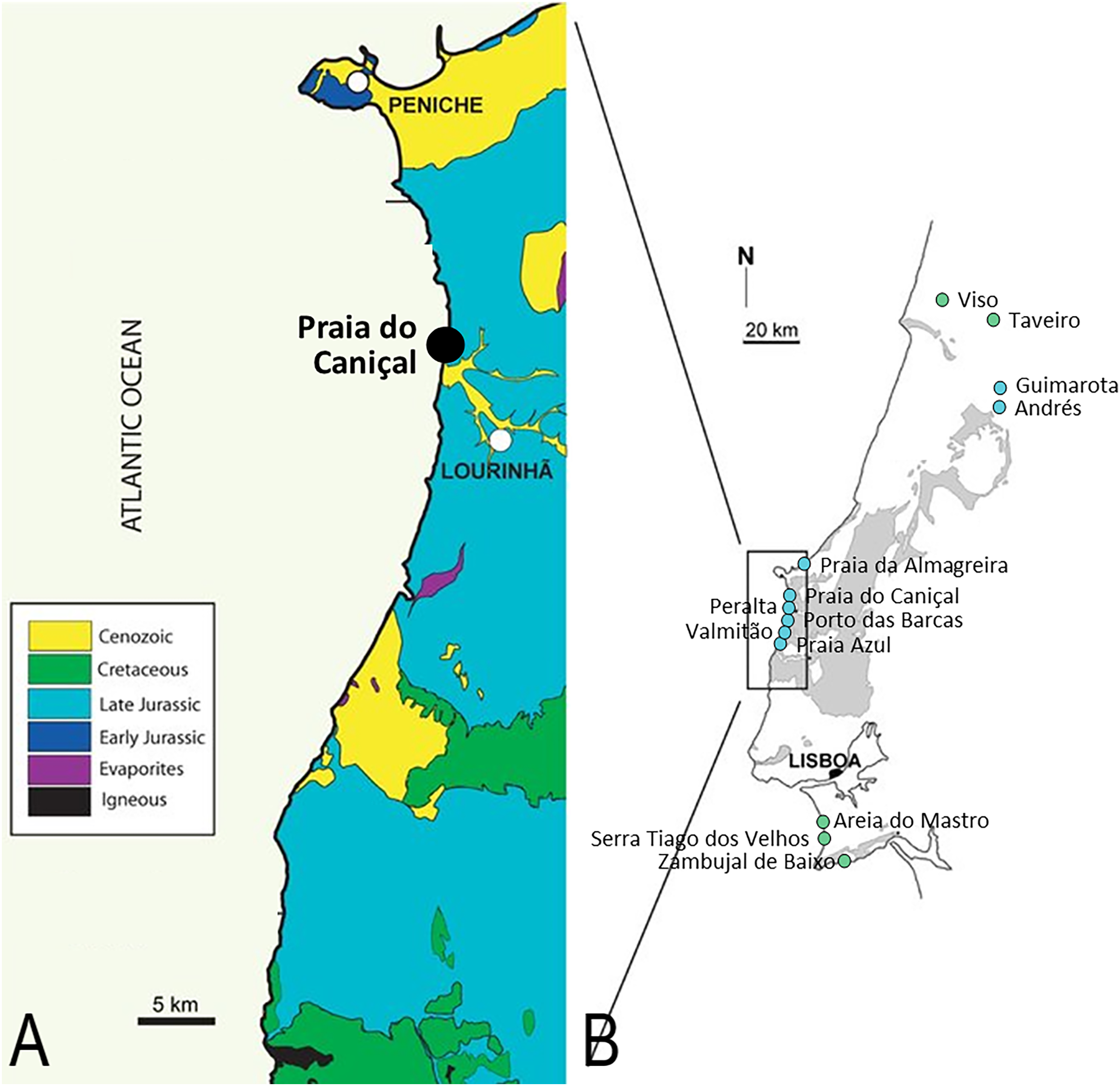
Pterosaur localities of Portugal

The Lusognathus holotype specimen, ML 2554, was in November 2018 discovered by amateur paleontologist Filipe Vieira in the Lourinhã Formation of Lisbon Region, Portugal, on the Praia do Caniçal, in Lourinhã. The formation dates from the Kimmeridgian-Tithonian, and the fossil is about 149.2 million years old. In March 2019, the Museu da Lourinhã carried out further excavations uncovering additional elements of the same specimen. Vieira donated the original find to the museum. The specimen was prepared by Carla Alexandra Tomás, Micael Martinho, Laura de Jorge and Carla Hernandez. It consists of an incomplete premaxillary rostrum, a fragment of the maxillae, two isolated partial teeth, and three or four fragmentary cervical vertebrae.

In 2023, Alexandra E. Fernandes, Victor Beccari, Alexander Wilhelm Armin Kellner and Octávio Mateus described Lusognathus almadrava as a new genus and species of ctenochasmatid pterosaur based on these fossil remains. The generic name, "Lusognathus", combines the Latin prefix "Luso", from Lusitania, an archaic name used by Ancient Romans in reference to Portugal, with the Latinised Greek word "gnathos", meaning "jaw". The specific name, "almadrava", references an elaborate fishing trap traditionally used to catch seafood in Portugal. It is the first pterosaur taxon named from Portugal.

== Description ==
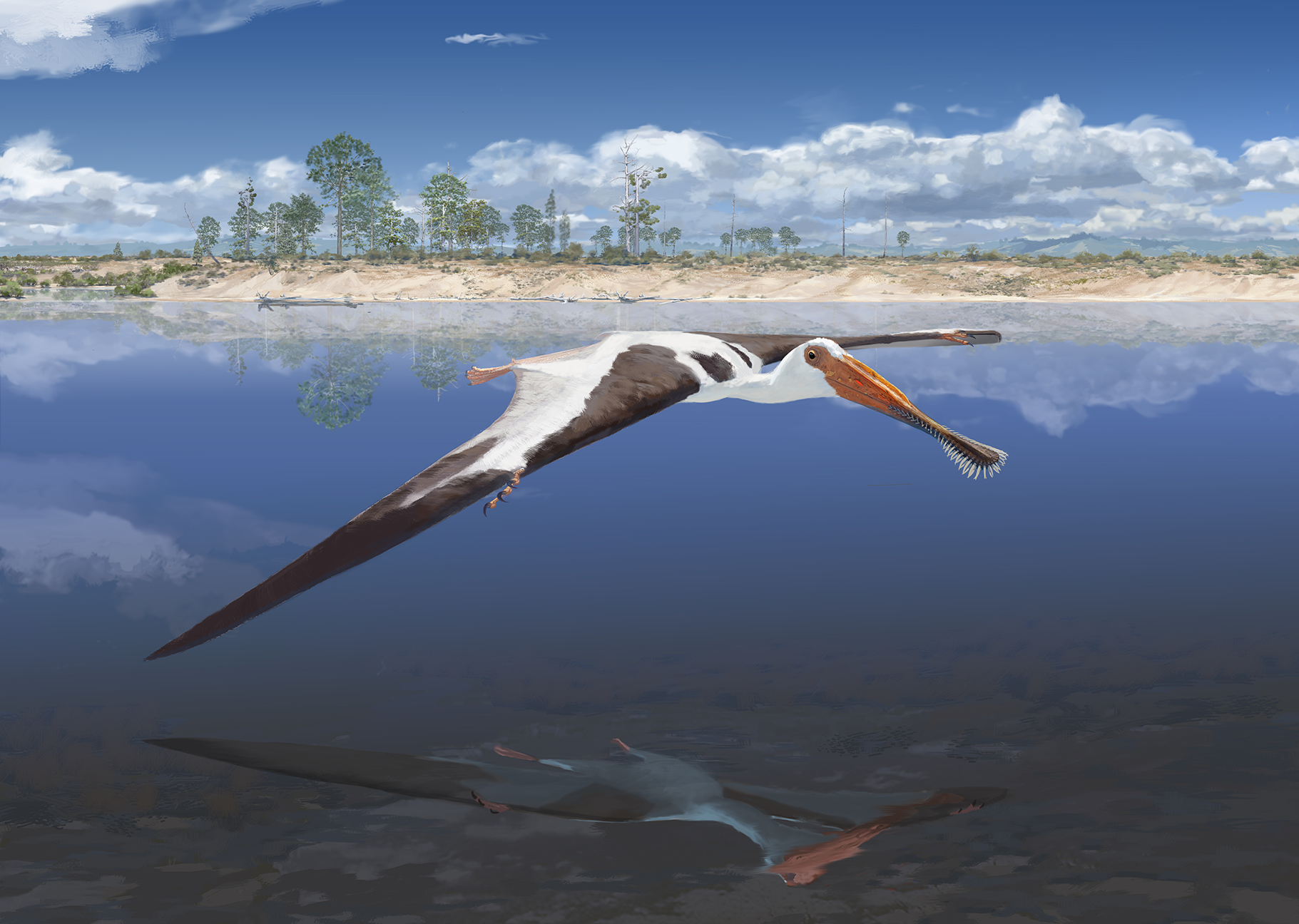
Speculative life restoration

Lusognathus is probably one of the largest pterosaurs known from the Jurassic. The snout pieces have a combined preserved length of 20.2 centimetres (8.0 in). A comparison with the skull of Gnathosaurus subulatus results in a total length estimate of 60.8 centimetres (23.9 in). From this, a wingspan can be derived of 3.6 metres (12 ft). Such a considerable size is confirmed by pterosaur tracks found ten kilometres to the south showing foot lengths of between 5.5–15 centimetres (2.2–5.9 in). This would make Lusognathus the largest known Jurassic member of the Gnathosaurinae. Only a few Cretaceous gnathosaurines are larger.

A distinguishing combination of traits was provided. The front of the premaxilla shows a rounded triangular expansion. Directly behind the spatula-shaped expansion of the snout the paired maxillae are constricted. The teeth are robust, stick out sideways, have a density of 1.3 teeth per centimetre, have a round to oval cross-section, and at the rear of the maxillae are directed obliquely to the front and sides.

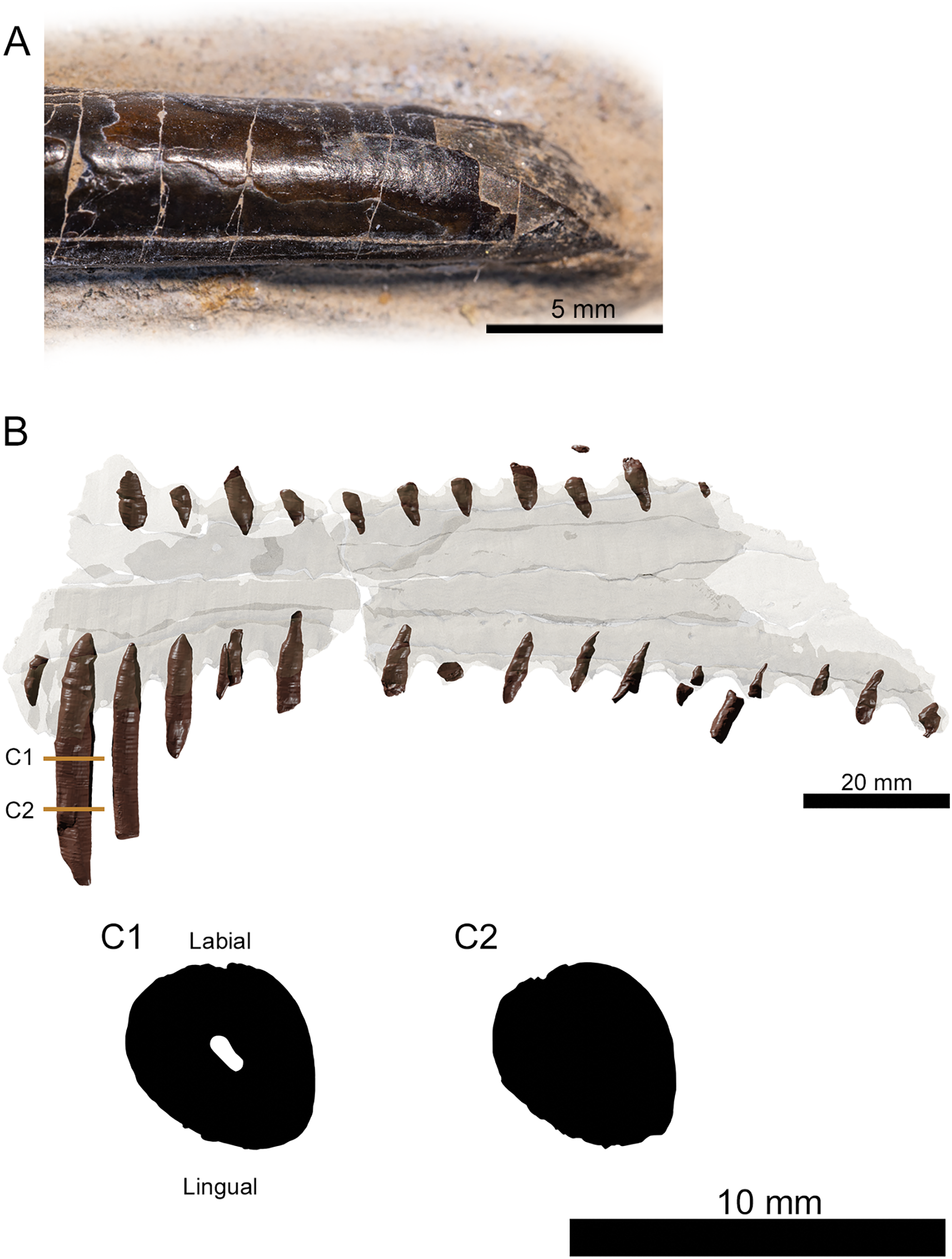
Tooth morphology

As with all gnathosaurines, the snout is strongly flattened vertically. Though elongated, the snout is relatively wide. To the front, it expands sideways, creating a spatula shape. This expansion starts 28 millimetres (1.1 in) from the front edge. The widest point is at the level of the largest tooth pair. Behind the constriction, the snout begins to widen again but very gradually. There is no sign of a preserved snout crest, but with gnathosaurines, such crests tend to be positioned rather posteriorly.

Each upper jaw side bears at least sixteen teeth, eight of which are in the premaxilla. The original total was probably higher as relatives have a known total of at least twenty-five teeth, seven in the premaxilla. The anterior teeth are straight, placed perpendicular to the jawline. Their cross-section is rounded but the upper base and lower point are somewhat pinched causing a certain keeling. The teeth are very robust and large; the fourth tooth has a crown length 23.5 millimetres (0.93 in) longer than half of the transverse snout width at this point. Each tooth is placed in its own socket. The base of the crown is reinforced by a conspicuous bone ring. To the rear the teeth gradually decrease in size, are oriented more to the front but also curve more to behind. The tooth enamel is completely smooth, without any wrinkles.

== Classification ==
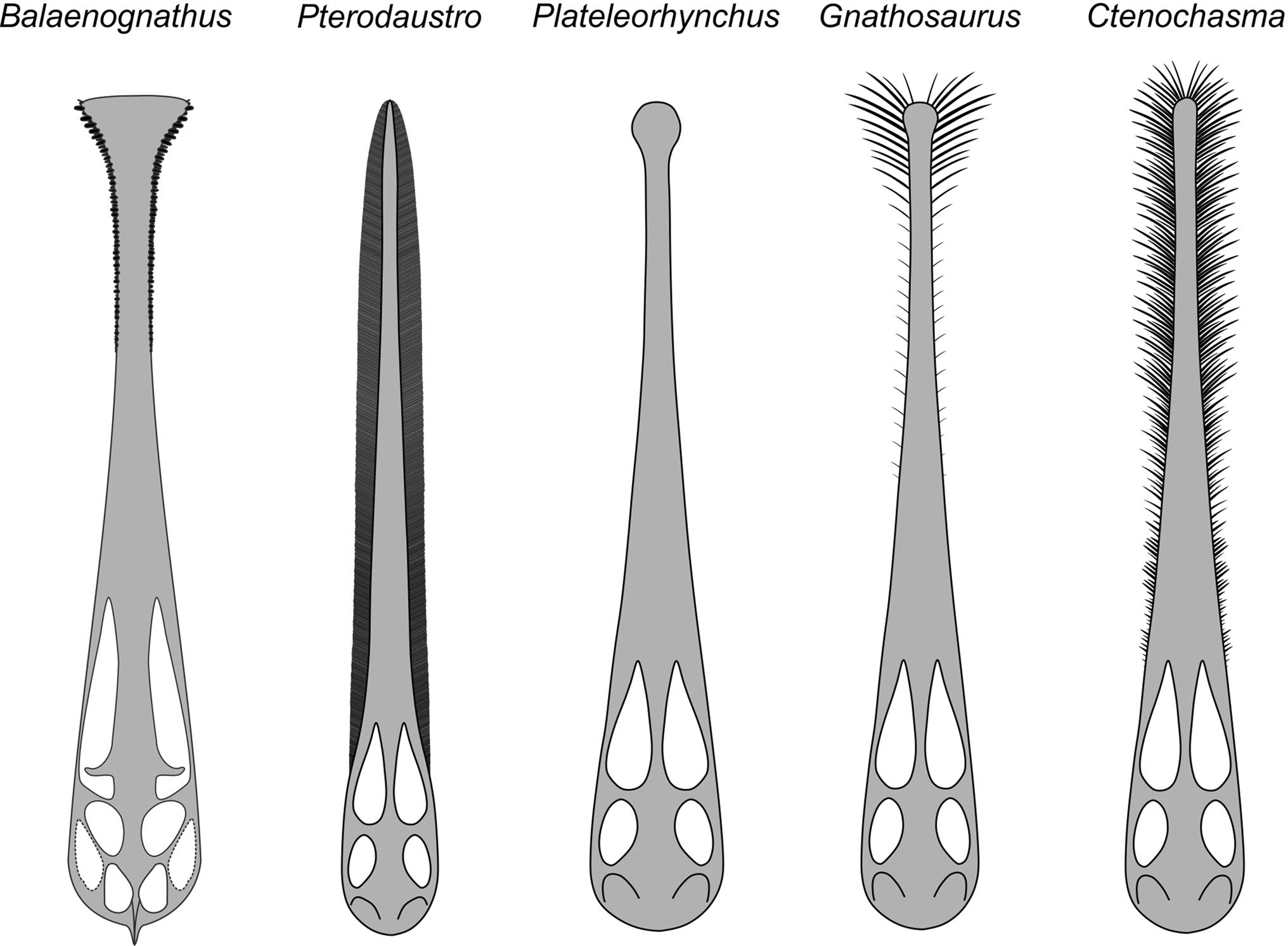
Ctenochasmatid pterosaurs have varied skull morphology; Gnathosaurus and Plataleorhynchus are close relatives of Lusognathus

Fernandes et al. (2023) recovered Lusognathus as a member of the ctenochasmatid clade Gnathosaurinae, as the sister taxon to the two known species of Gnathosaurus, G. subulatus and G. macrurus. A later 2025 study by Sita Manitkoon and colleagues described the new gnathosaurine Garudapterus, finding it to be the closest relative of Lusognathus as supported by the similar orientation of their teeth. Tacuadactylus was found as an additional close relative of Lusognathus and Gnathosaurus, with all four united by the paired set of grooves along their palates. The result of their phylogenetic analysis is shown below:

- Ctenochasmatidae
  - - - Huanhepterus
      - - Aurorazhdarcho
        - Ardeadactylus
    - - - Elanodactylus
        - Forfexopterus
      - - Gladocephaloideus
        - - Feilongus
          - Moganopterus
  - - - Liaodactylus
      - - Pterofiltrus
        - Cathayopterus
    - - Gnathosaurinae
        - Plataleorhynchus
        - - - Lusognathus
            - Garudapterus
          - - Gnathosaurus
            - Tacuadactylus
      - - - Pterodaustro
          - - Gegepterus
            - Beipiaopterus
        - Ctenochasma

== Paleobiology ==
In view of its robust straight teeth, positioned at a rather large distance from each other, Lusognathus probably was not a filter feeder. An alternative lifestyle would have been that of a piscivore, killing fish prey with the spatula.
