= Tacuadactylus =

Tacuadactylus Temporal range: Late Jurassic, 152–145 Ma

Scientific classification
- Kingdom: Animalia
- Phylum: Chordata
- Class: Reptilia
- Order: †Pterosauria
- Suborder: †Pterodactyloidea
- Family: †Ctenochasmatidae
- Subfamily: †Gnathosaurinae
- Genus: †Tacuadactylus; Soto et al., 2021

Type species
- †Tacuadactylus luciae Soto et al., 2021

Genus of ctenochasmatid pterosaur from the Late Jurassic

Tacuadactylus is a genus of ctenochasmatid pterosaur from the Late Jurassic of Uruguay.

== Discovery and naming ==
A snout found near Batoví was in 2016 reported as a saw fish, the oldest known member of the Pristidae. Subsequently, a CAT-scan showed that the presumed perpendicular teeth of the fossil were in fact sediment fillings of the tooth sockets, which themselves pointed obliquely to the front as with pterosaurs. In 2018, the specimen was described as the first pterosaur found in Uruguay but not yet named.

In 2021, the type species Tacuadactylus luciae was named and described by Matías Soto, Felipe Montenegro, Pablo Toriño, Valeria Mesa and Daniel Perea. The generic name combines a reference to the location of the discovery with a Greek daktylos, "finger", a usual suffix in the names of pterosaurs. The specific name honours Soto's daughter, Lucia.

The holotype, FC-DPV-2869, was recovered from rocks in the Batoví Member of the lower Tacuarembó Formation. It consists of fragments of the rostrum and dentary. Other remains are six loose teeth, specimen FC-DPV 3090, found at Bidegain in the same formation.

== Classification ==
Tacuadactylus is a member of the Gnathosaurinae, and closely related to Gnathosaurus. It was in 2021 the oldest known ctenochasmatid from South America. Below is a cladogram from a 2025 study by Sita Maritkoon and colleagues, reaffirming its close relation to Gnathosaurus:

- Ctenochasmatidae
  - - - Huanhepterus
      - - Aurorazhdarcho
        - Ardeadactylus
    - - - Elanodactylus
        - Forfexopterus
      - - Gladocephaloideus
        - - Feilongus
          - Moganopterus
  - - - Liaodactylus
      - - Pterofiltrus
        - Cathayopterus
    - - Gnathosaurinae
        - Plataleorhynchus
        - - - Lusognathus
            - Garudapterus
          - - Gnathosaurus
            - Tacuadactylus
      - - - Pterodaustro
          - - Gegepterus
            - Beipiaopterus
        - Ctenochasma
