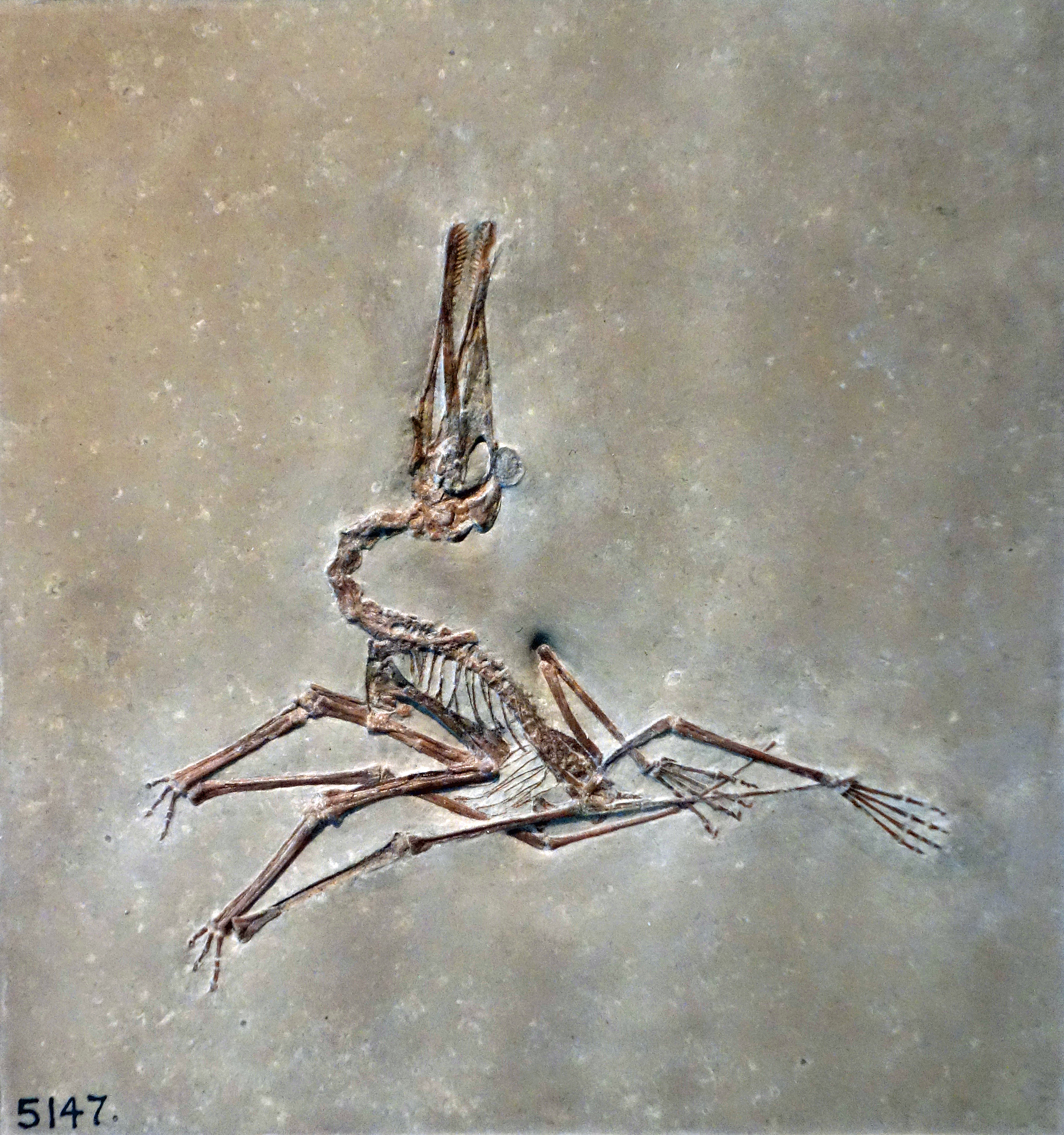
- Ctenochasma elegans specimen from Solnhofen

Scientific classification
- Kingdom: Animalia
- Phylum: Chordata
- Class: Reptilia
- Order: †Pterosauria
- Suborder: †Pterodactyloidea
- Clade: †Ctenochasmatoidea
- Family: †Ctenochasmatidae; Nopsca, 1928

Type species
- †Ctenochasma roemeri Meyer, 1852

Subgroups
- †Ardeadactylus?; †Aurorazhdarcho?; †Balaenognathus; †Cathayopterus; †Cratonopterus; †Kepodactylus; †Liaodactylus; †Otogopterus; †Petrodactyle?; †Pterofiltrus; †Ctenochasmatinae; †Ctenochasma; †Pterodaustrini; †Bakiribu; †Beipiaopterus?; †Eosipterus?; †Gegepterus?; †Pterodaustro; †Gnathosaurinae; †Garudapterus; †Gnathosaurus; †Lusognathus; †Plataleorhynchus; †Spathagnathus; †Tacuadactylus; †Moganopterinae; †Elanodactylus?; †Feilongus; †Forfexopterus?; †Gladocephaloideus?; †Huanhepterus?; †Moganopterus

= Ctenochasmatidae =

Ctenochasmatids Temporal range: Late Jurassic - Early Cretaceous 152–105 Ma

Family of ctenochasmatoid pterosaurs

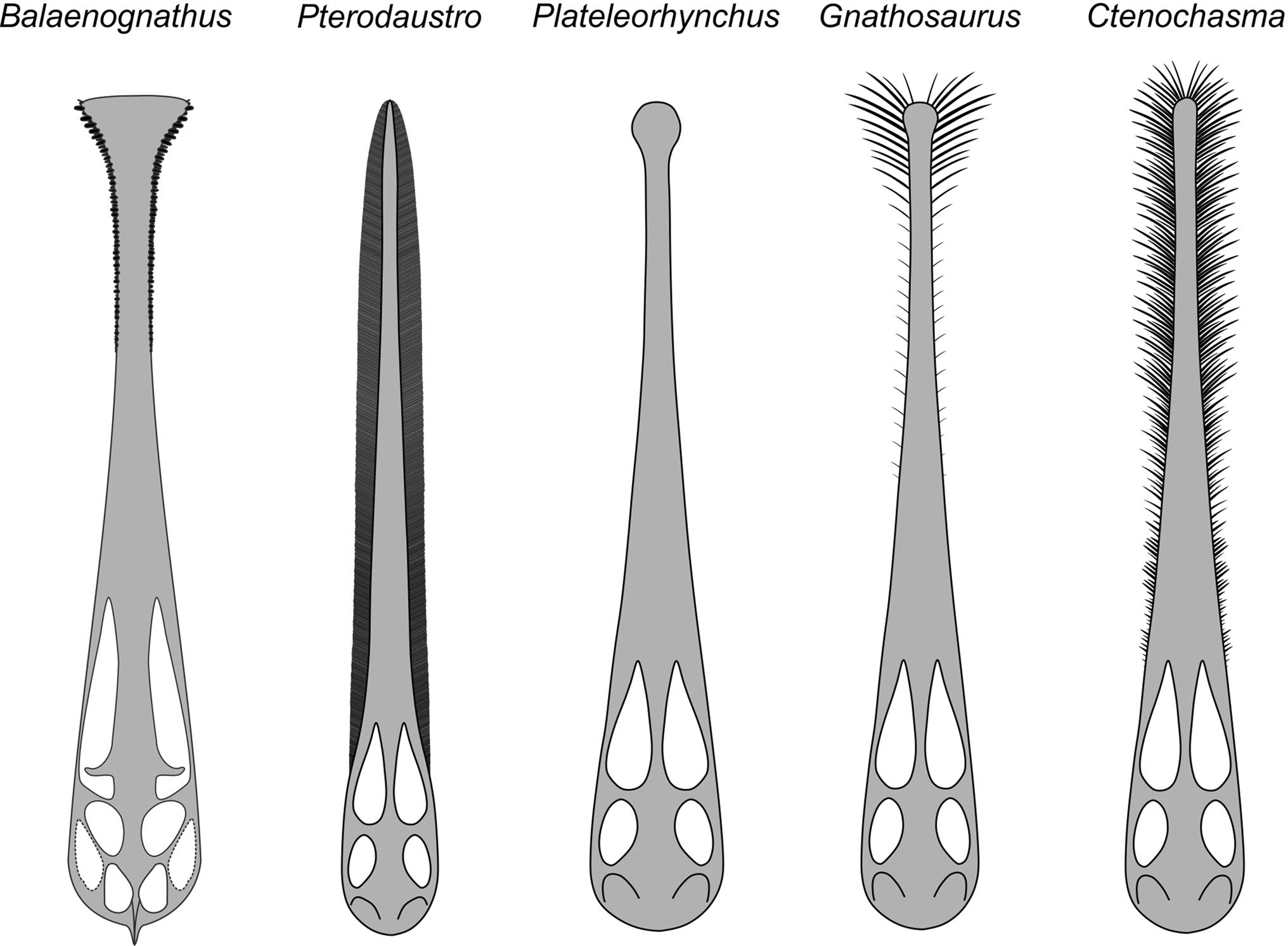
Ctenochasmatid skulls demonstrating suspension feeding characteristics

Ctenochasmatidae is a group of pterosaurs within the suborder Pterodactyloidea. They are characterized by their distinctive teeth, which are thought to have been used for filter-feeding. Ctenochasmatids lived from the Late Jurassic to the Early Cretaceous periods.

The earliest known ctenochasmatid remains date to the Late Jurassic Kimmeridgian age. Previously, a fossil jaw recovered from the Middle Jurassic Stonesfield Slate formation in the United Kingdom, was considered the oldest known. This specimen supposedly represented a member of the family Ctenochasmatidae, though further examination suggested it actually belonged to a teleosaurid stem-crocodilian instead of a pterosaur.

== Classification ==
Below is cladogram following a topology recovered by Brian Andres, using the most recent iteration of his data set (Andres, 2021). Anders found that three subfamilies fall within the Ctenochasmatidae: Ctenochasmatinae, Gnathosaurinae and Moganopterinae, while also including several basal genera.

- Ctenochasmatidae
  - Ctenochasmatinae
    - "Pterodactylus" micronyx
    - - - Liaodactylus
        - Ctenochasma
      - Pterodaustrini
        - Pterodaustro
        - - Beipiaopterus
          - Gegepterus
  - - Kepodactylus
    - - Elanodactylus
      - - Moganopterinae
          - Feilongus
          - Moganopterus
        - - Ardeadactylus
          - Gnathosaurinae
            - Huanhepterus
            - - Plataleorhynchus
              - Gnathosaurus
