= Cratonopterus =

Cratonopterus Temporal range: Early Cretaceous (Valanginian–Hauterivian), 135.4–128.7 Ma
- Holotype specimen

Scientific classification
- Kingdom: Animalia
- Phylum: Chordata
- Class: Reptilia
- Order: †Pterosauria
- Suborder: †Pterodactyloidea
- Clade: †Ctenochasmatoidea
- Family: †Ctenochasmatidae
- Genus: †Cratonopterus; Jiang et al., 2023
- Species: †C. huabei

Binomial name
- †Cratonopterus huabei Jiang et al., 2023

Genus of ctenochasmatid pterosaur

Cratonopterus (meaning "craton wing") is an extinct genus of ctenochasmatid pterosaur known from the Early Cretaceous (Valanginian to Hauterivian ages) Huajiying Formation of China. The genus contains a single species, Cratonopterus huabei, known from a partial skeleton. Cratonopterus represents the first named pterosaur from the Huajiying Formation.

== Discovery and naming ==
Details of the C. huabei axial skeleton

The Cratonopterus huabei holotype specimen, IVPP V 14935, was discovered in sediments of the Huajiying Formation in Fengning County, Hebei Province, China. The incomplete, partially articulated specimen consists of the last three cervical (neck) vertebrae, nine dorsal vertebrae, the sternum, the right scapulocoracoid, a partial right wing, gastralia, and ribs.

In 2023, Jiang et al. described Cratonopterus huabei as a new genus and species of ctenochasmatid pterosaur based on these fossil remains. The generic name, Cratonopterus, combines a reference to cratons—derived from the Greek word kratos, after the geological feature where the specimen was found—with the Greek pterus, meaning "wing". The specific name huabei means "north China" in Chinese pinyin, in reference to the North China Craton.

== Description ==
Cratonopterus is a medium-sized ctenochasmatid, with an estimated wingspan of around 1.8 metres (5.9 ft). The holotype individual was likely an actively growing subadult when it died, close to being fully grown. The first wing phalanx exhibits a large pneumatic foramen. Although this feature is also seen in members of the Ornithocheiroidea, Jiang et al. interpreted it as an autapomorphy, or unique feature, of Cratonopterus within the Ctenochasmatidae. The coracoid bone of the shoulder does not have an expansion where it touches the scapula. This feature is also unique, as an expansion is present in other ctenochasmatids.

== Classification ==
Details of the C. huabei appendicular skeleton

Due to the elongated wing metacarpal of the specimen, Jiang et al. (2023) suggested that Cratonopterus can clearly be classified as a pterodactyloid. It can further be assigned to the Ctenochasmatidae as the proportions of the postcranial remains are most similar to members of this clade such as Forfexopterus, Elanodactylus, and Eosipterus.

== Paleoenvironment ==
The C. huabei holotype was discovered in layers of the Huajiying Formation, which dates to the middle Valanginian to middle Hauterivian ages of the early Cretaceous period. Cratonopterus is the first pterosaur species named from this formation. However, an incomplete wing and almost complete right foot of a pterosaur have previously been described from the same locality and interpreted as belonging to an ornithocheiroid, indicating some diversity in the formation's pterosaur fauna. Fossils of non-avian theropod dinosaurs (Jinfengopteryx and Xunmenglong), enantiornithean birds (Cruralispennia, Eopengornis, Jibeinia, Protopteryx, Shenqiornis, Vescornis), the ornithuromorph bird Archaeornithura, various fish, and the spinicaudatan (clam shrimp) Yanjiestheria have also been described from members of the Huajiying Formation.
