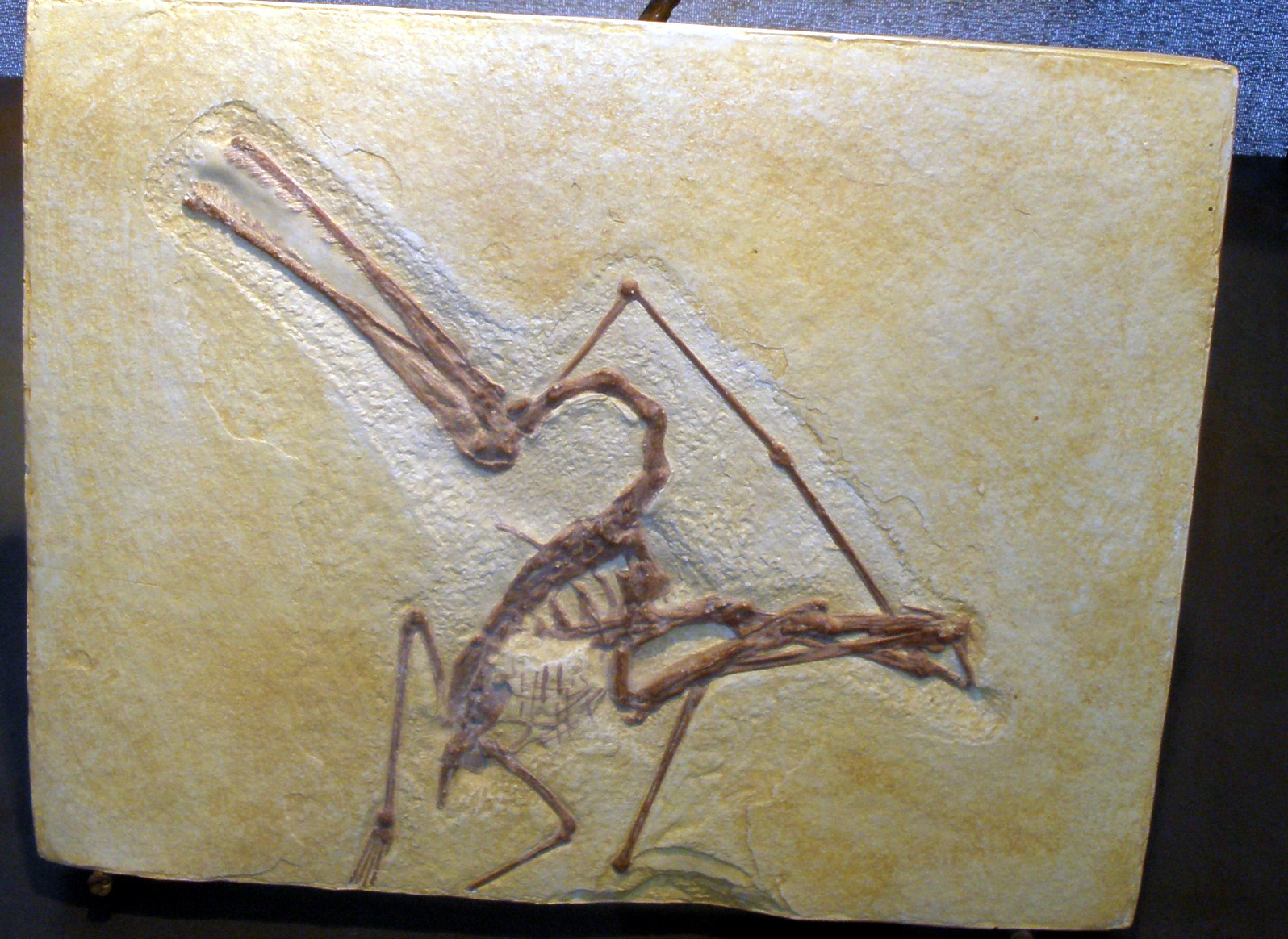
- Fossil specimen of a juvenile C. elegans

Scientific classification
- Kingdom: Animalia
- Phylum: Chordata
- Class: Reptilia
- Order: †Pterosauria
- Suborder: †Pterodactyloidea
- Family: †Ctenochasmatidae
- Subfamily: †Ctenochasmatinae
- Genus: †Ctenochasma; Meyer, 1851

Type species
- †Ctenochasma roemeri Meyer, 1851

Other species
- †C. elegans (Wagner, 1861) [originally Pterodactylus]; †C. taqueti Bennett, 2007

Synonyms
- Genus synonymy: Ptenodracon Lydekker, 1888; Synonyms of C. elegans: Pterodactylus elegans Wagner, 1861

= Ctenochasma =

Ctenochasma Temporal range: Late Jurassic 150–145 Ma

Genus of ctenochasmatid pterosaur from the Late Jurassic

Ctenochasma (meaning "comb jaw") is a genus of Late Jurassic ctenochasmatid pterosaur belonging to the suborder Pterodactyloidea. Three species are currently recognized: C. roemeri (named after Friedrich Adolph Roemer), C. taqueti, and C. elegans. Their fossilized remains have been found in the Solnhofen Limestone of Bavaria, Germany, the "Purbeck Group" of northeastern Germany, and the Calcaires tâchetés of eastern France.

== History ==
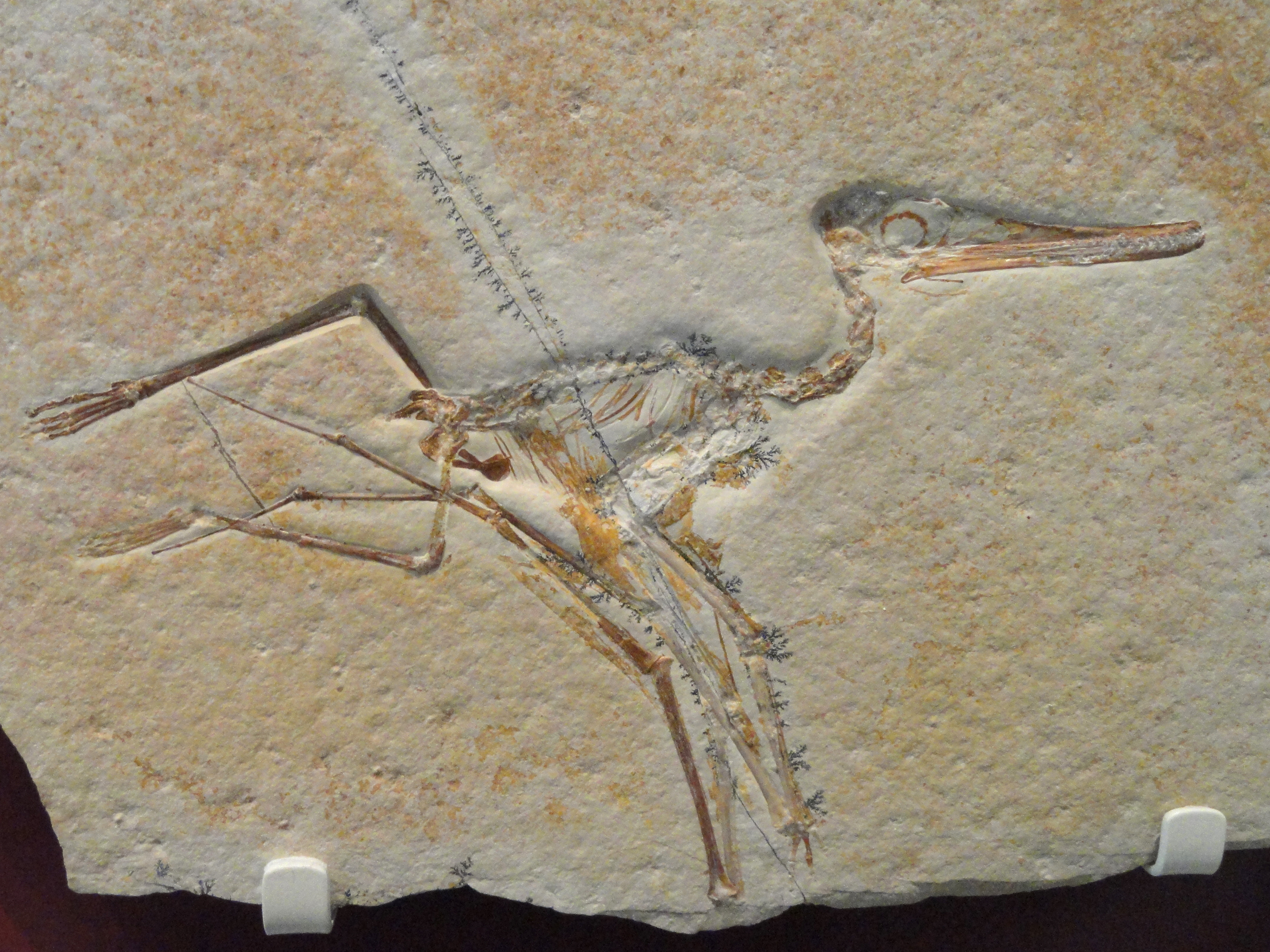
Fossil specimen of a young juvenile C. elegans

The name Ctenochasma was coined by the German paleontologist Christian Erich Hermann von Meyer in 1851, based on a single lower jaw full of closely packed teeth which he gave the species name Ctenochasma roemeri. Von Meyer did not consider the specimen to belong to a pterosaur; instead, he compared it to Gnathosaurus, which at that time was considered to be a crocodilian. A second species, C. gracile, was named by Oppel in 1862 based on a fragmentary skull.

In the mid-20th century, the possibility was raised that these multi-toothed skulls with distinctive awl-shaped teeth might belong to birds or pterosaurs rather than gharial-like crocodilians. However, it was not until the work of Peter Wellnhofer, who systematically reviewed known German pterosaur fossils in 1970, that Ctenochasma and Gnathosaurus became universally accepted as pterosaurs. At this time, many juvenile pterosaurs previously referred to as Pterodactylus micronyx and Pterodactylus elegans were referred to Ctenochasma. This included the holotype specimen of P. elegans. Because the species name elegans was named before gracile, the species is now known as Ctenochasma elegans. An additional species, C. porocristata, was named by Paul de Buisonjé in 1981. However, it was differentiated mainly by the presence of a crest along the snout, which has since been shown to be a feature related to growth or sex, rather than species.

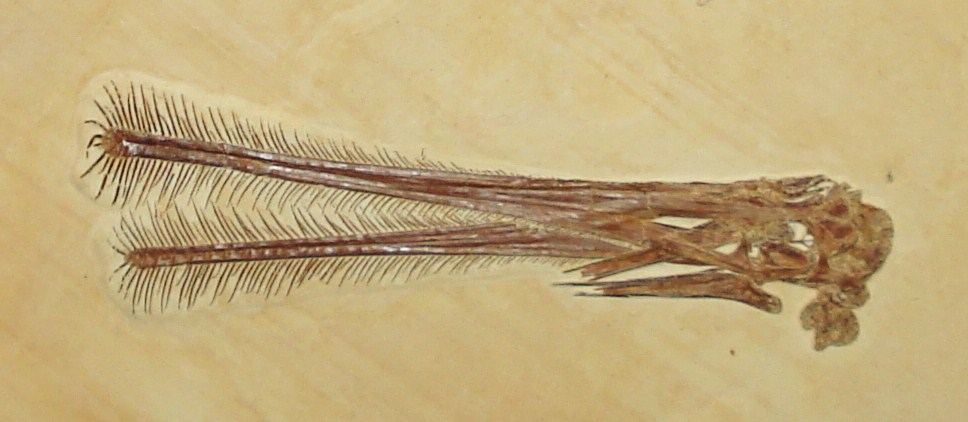
Fossil skull of a subadult C. elegans

A fourth species of Ctenochasma was first described (but not named) by Philippe Taquet in 1972. A single specimen, consisting of a partial skull with complete brain case, was found in France and housed in the collections of the Saint-Dizier Museum. Detailed comparison to other Ctenochasma specimens in 2004 confirmed that it was a new species. In honor of Taquet's work on the specimen, Christopher Bennett named the species C. taqueti in 2007.

Although researchers in the late 1990s and early 2000s, including Bennett and Jouve, suggested that all these species probably represented growth stages on just one kind of Ctenochasma, in a more comprehensive 2007 study, Bennett demonstrated that three distinct species could be recognized based on the number and slenderness of the teeth, which varied across all growth stages. C. roemeri, the earliest species, is characterized by its relatively low number of only moderately slender teeth. The later C. taqueti had a moderate number of slender teeth, and the last species, C. elegans, had a high number of very slender teeth. These three species, arranged chronologically, probably represent a single evolutionary lineage in which the filter-feeding apparatus was gradually refined.

== Description ==
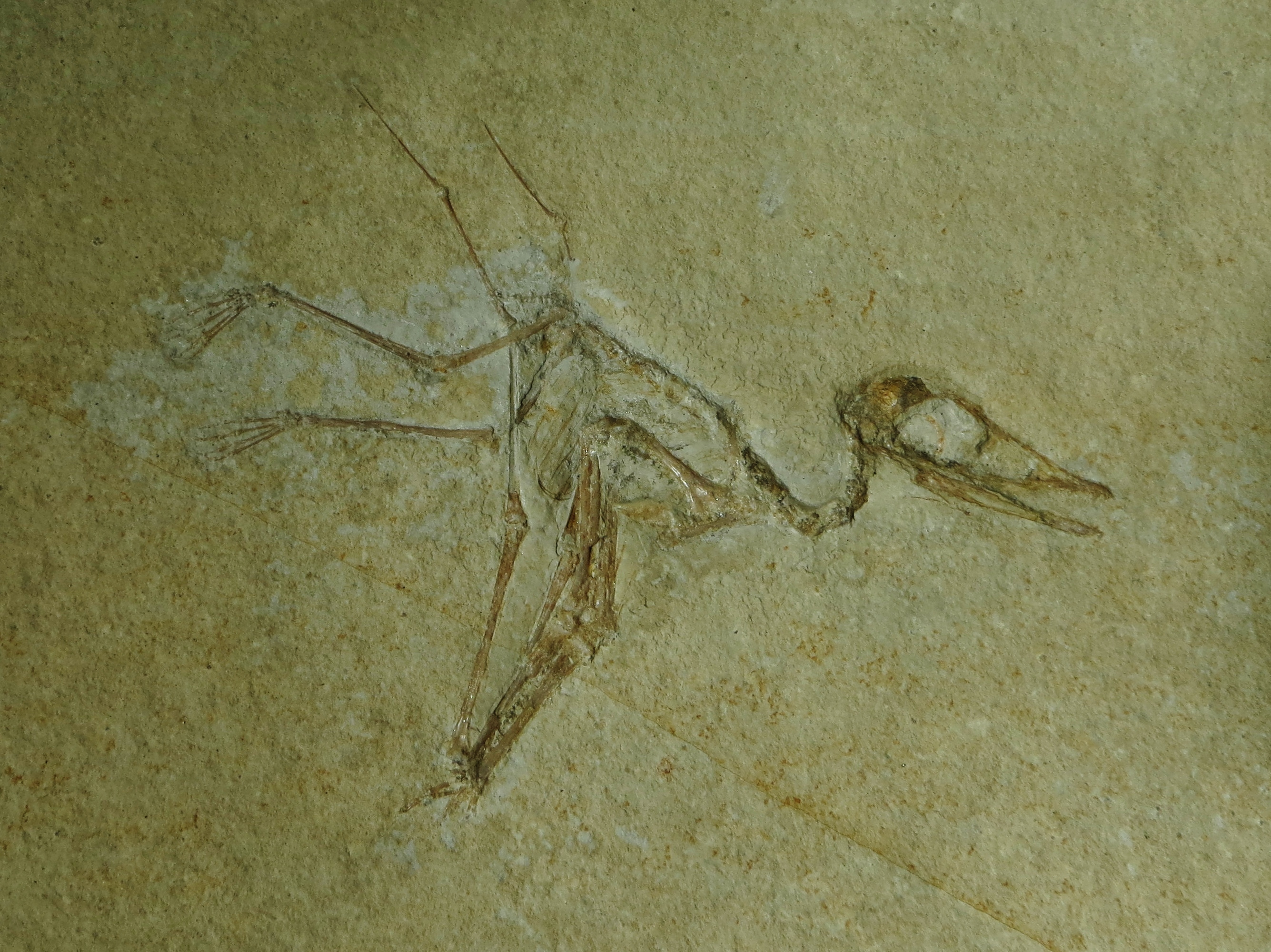
Juvenile specimen (TM 13104) in Teylers Museum

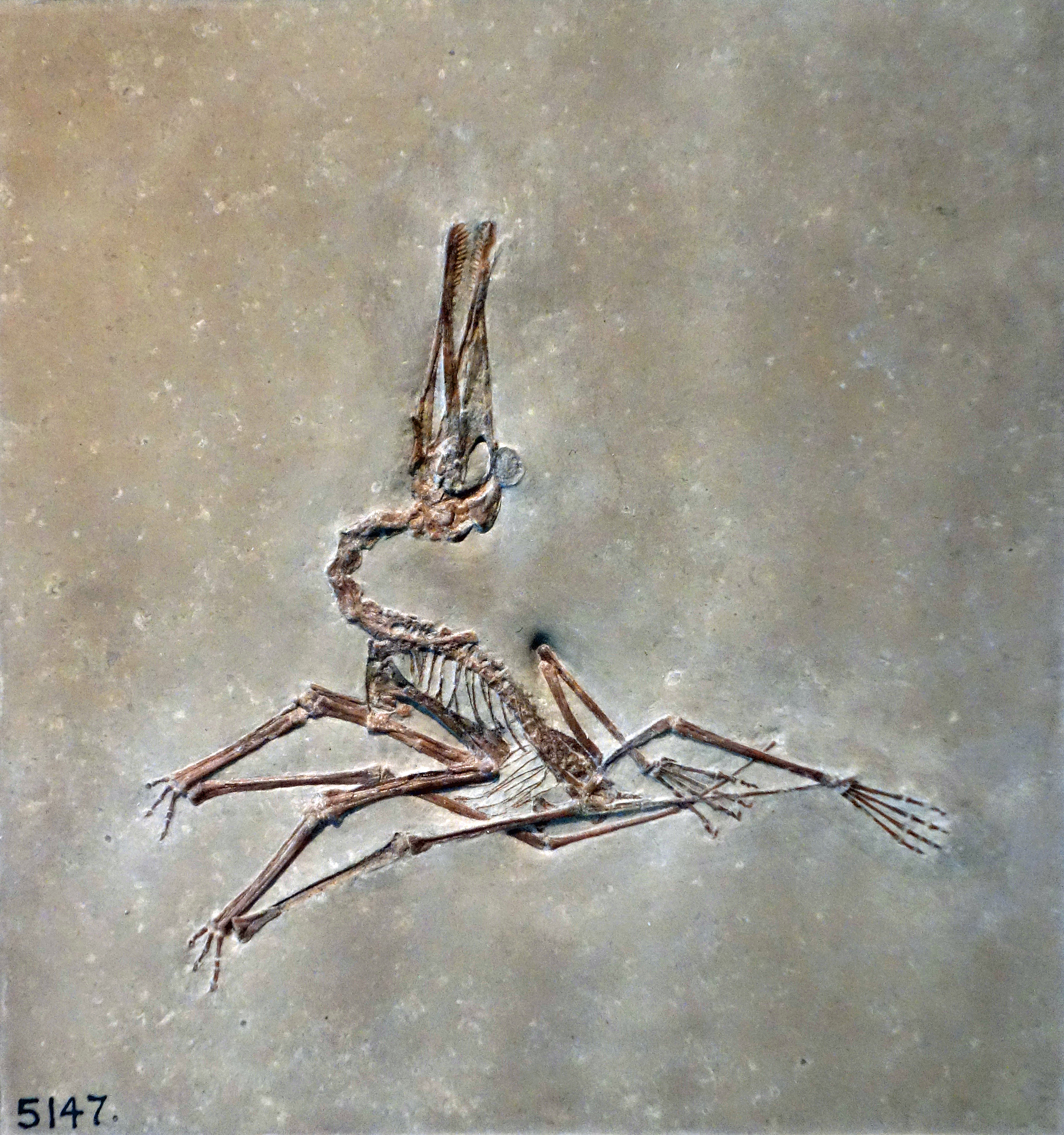
Fossil specimen of a young juvenile C. elegans

Ctenochasma is distinguished mainly by its numerous (over 400 in adults) long, thin, curved and closely packed teeth, which lined its elongated and narrow snout. The teeth were so closely packed that they formed a comb, and in adults they projected outward away from the jaws, forming a basket; traditionally, these are thought to indicate a filter feeding lifestyle, straining water through the teeth in order to capture and eat small invertebrates, but unlike the related Pterodaustro it lacks adaptations that would form a pumping mechanism. Instead, the spatulate profile formed by the teeth probably indicate a spoonbill-like lifestyle, increasing the surface area of the jaws in order to catch small prey. The snout curved slightly upward and was rounded at the tip, and the teeth were restricted to the front half of the jaws.

The smallest species, Ctenochasma elegans, had a maximum wingspan of 1.9 metres (6.2 ft) as an adult. Ctenochasma is distinguished by its mouth which contained as many as 260 long, thin comb-like teeth. Adult Ctenochasma had a bony crest along the skull, though this is not found in juveniles.

Comparisons between the scleral rings of both Ctenochasma elegans and Ctenochasma taqueti and modern birds and reptiles suggest that these taxa may have been nocturnal, and may have had activity patterns similar to modern nocturnal seabirds. This may also indicate niche partitioning with contemporary pterosaurs inferred to be diurnal, such as Pterodactylus and Scaphognathus.

Compared to other ctenochasmatoids, it had larger wings, and may have displayed a flying style comparable to that of modern skuas.

== Classification ==
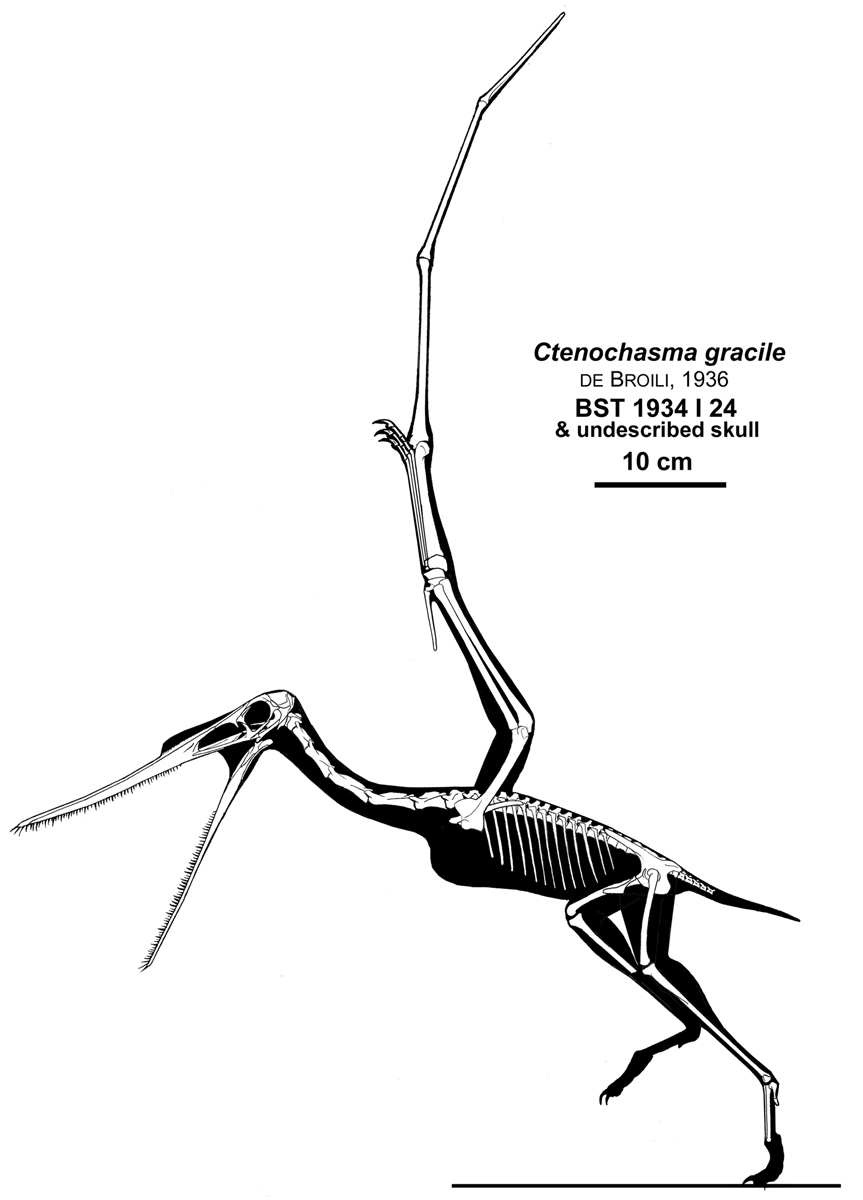
Skeletal reconstruction

Below is cladogram following a topology by Andres, Clark and Xu (2014). In the analysis, they recovered Ctenochasma within the family Ctenochasmatidae, more precisely within the subfamily Ctenochasmatinae, sister taxon to the tribe Pterodaustrini.

- Ctenochasmatidae
  - Ctenochasmatinae
    - Ctenochasma
    - Pterodaustrini
      - Pterodaustro guinazui
      - - Eosipterus yangi
        - - Beipiaopterus chenianus
          - Gegepterus changi
  - - Kepodactylus insperatus
    - - Elanodactylus prolatus
      - - Moganopterinae
          - Feilongus youngi
          - Moganopterus zhuiana
        - Gnathosaurinae
          - Huanhepterus quingyangensis
          - - Plataleorhynchus streptophorodon
            - - Gnathosaurus subulatus
              - Gnathosaurus macrurus

== See also ==
- List of pterosaur genera
- Timeline of pterosaur research
