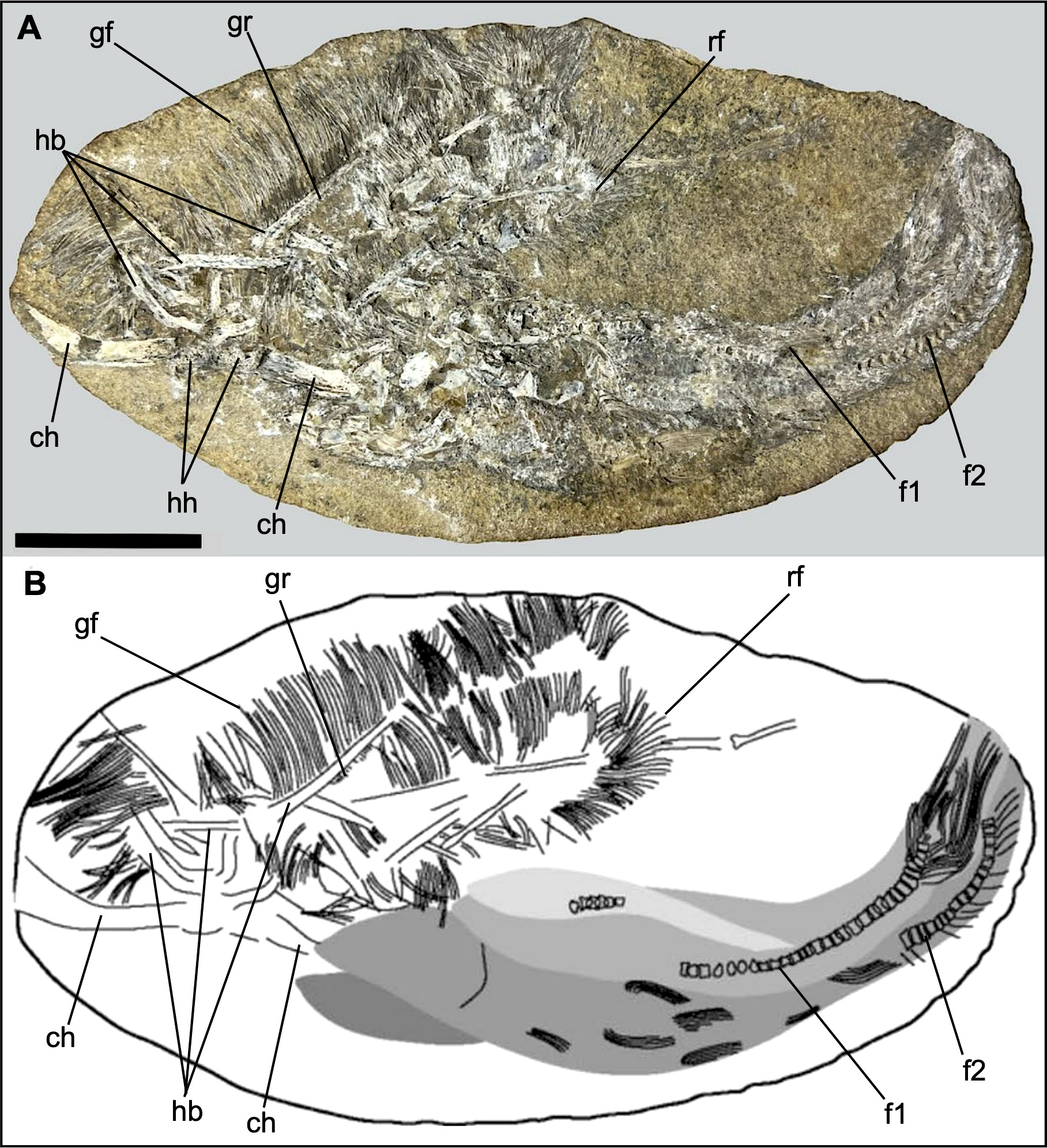
- B. waridza concretion including the holotype (interpreted as fish remains) and associated fish specimens

Scientific classification
- Kingdom: Animalia
- Phylum: Chordata
- Order: †Pterosauria
- Suborder: †Pterodactyloidea
- Family: †Ctenochasmatidae
- Subfamily: †Ctenochasmatinae
- Tribe: †Pterodaustrini
- Genus: †Bakiribu; Pêgas et al., 2025
- Species: †B. waridza

Binomial name
- †Bakiribu waridza Pêgas et al., 2025

= Bakiribu =

Bakiribu Temporal range: Early Cretaceous, late Aptian–early Albian

Genus of ctenochasmatid pterosaurs

Bakiribu (lit. 'comb') is an extinct animal genus known from the Early Cretaceous (Aptian–Albian age) Romualdo Formation of Brazil. The genus contains a single species, Bakiribu waridza. It was initially described as a ctenochasmatid pterosaur based on remains interpreted as the fragmentary jaws of two individuals preserved in a regurgitalite. This would indicate the pair may have been consumed by a spinosaurid theropod dinosaur. This interpretation of the remains suggests that Bakiribu has a unique pattern of closely-packed comblike teeth in the upper and lower jaws that may have been used for filter feeding, similar to the closely related Pterodaustro. Under this identification, Bakiribu would represent the first member of the broader clade Archaeopterodactyloidea described from the Romualdo Formation.

Subsequent researchers have suggested that the proposed pterosaurian jaw bones are instead part of the gill arch apparatus of a fish, as these two distinct anatomical structures are superficially similar. As such, the validity of B. waridza as a distinct taxon is unclear and requires further observations.

== Discovery and naming ==
Several years prior to 2025, Aline M. Ghilardi and William B. S. Almeida discovered a calcareous concretion from the Romualdo Formation, part of the Araripe Basin, in northeastern Brazil in the collection of the Museu Câmara Cascudo. The concretion specimen had remained at the museum for several years without study; its exact provenance is unknown. The concretion style of preservation, with specimens preserved in a part and counterpart visible when the block is split open, is typical of material collected in this formation. The two specimen parts were accessioned as MCC1271.1-V and MCC1271.2-V at the Museu Câmara Cascudo (MCC), part of the Federal University of Rio Grande do Norte in Rio Grande do Norte, Brazil. It comprises the fragmented upper and lower jaws of two pterosaur individuals, as well as four associated fish, likely of the genus Tharrhias, with their heads pointing in the same direction.

Subsequently, researchers recognized that the pterosaur material in the concretion represented a novel taxon. They arranged for one half of the concretion (MCC 1271.2-V) to be transferred to the Museu de Paleontologia Plácido Cidade Nuvens (MPSC) in Ceará, Brazil, which is closer to the region from which it was collected. It is now deposited at this institution as specimen MPSC R 7312.

In 2025, R. V. Pêgas and colleagues described Bakiribu waridza as a new genus and species of ctenochasmatid pterosaurs based on these fossil remains. The generic name, Bakiribu, is a Kariri word meaning 'comb', referencing the comblike teeth of this taxon and its relatives. The specific name, waridza, is a Kariri word meaning 'mouth' The combined binomial name is intended to reference the animal's unique dentition, as well as honor the Kariri people—the indigenous inhabitants of the type locality—and their cultural heritage. Of the jaw fragments identified (labeled as a–g), a was assigned as the holotype specimen, with b–d likely belonging to this individual, while e was assigned as a paratype, with f and g likely belonging to the same individual.

== Description ==
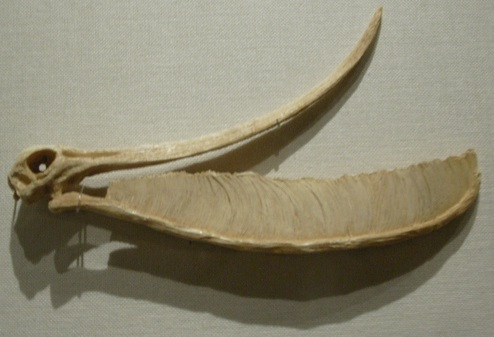
Skull of the ctenochasmatid Pterodaustro, which had a comparable arrangement of long, comblike teeth, albeit only in the lower jaw

Like many ctenochasmatid pterosaurs, Bakiribu has very elongate jaws with many closely-packed teeth. The upper jaw tip is slightly more expanded than that of the lower jaw, allowing the two larger and two smaller jaw fragments observed in the concretion to be recognized as the upper and lower jaws of at least two individuals. The jaws were slightly curved upward, similar to Gegepterus and other members of this family. The extreme degree to which teeth are packed into the jaws is most comparable to Pterodaustro although the dense, comblike teeth are only present in the lower jaw. In Bakiribu, there are may have been between 440 and 568 teeth per side of the jaw, with the interdental gaps (space between teeth) smaller than the diameter of the teeth themselves. In contrast, the teeth of Pterodaustro are so densely packed that there are no interdental gaps. Two autapomorphies (unique derived traits) were identified in Bakiribu; first, the teeth exhibit acrodont implantation (teeth implanted at the top of an alveolar ridge, rather than in sockets) in both the upper and lower jaws, and second, the tooth crowns have a subquadrangular cross-section. In comparison only the upper jaw teeth of Pterodaustro are acrodont, and the teeth of all other ctenochasmatids are circular or elliptical in cross-section.

The tooth and skull morphology of Bakiribu is somewhat transitional between the older Ctenochasma and younger Pterodaustro, with the former having shorter, more widely-spaced teeth and the latter having longer, more densely-packed teeth. Regardless, all of these taxa are speculated to have used their unique dentition as a means for filter feeding.

== Paleobiology ==
The concretion specimen containing both Bakiribu specimens was identified as a likely regurgitalite, meaning the preserved remains of the stomach contents regurgitated by a predator. The likely producer of this regurgitalite was a spinosaurid theropod dinosaur, as these are known to have lived in the Romualdo Formation paleoenvironment and were large enough to predate on smaller pterosaurs. The presence of four fish preserved in the same orientation supports this hypothesis, as modern piscivorous animals are known to preferentially consume fish head-first. Pêgas and colleagues suggested that the pterosaurs were consumed first, and that the discomfort of digesting them (especially the tooth-bearing jaw bones) caused it to regurgitate them in addition to its more recent meal of fish.

Notably, Bakiribu is the only archaeopterodactyloid pterosaur yet described from the Romualdo Formation. This may indicate that these specimens are allochthonous, having originated from a different locality. Pêgas and colleagues speculated that the predator that regurgitated the Bakiribu specimens consumed them outside of the environment that preserves other Romualdo Formation pterosaurs. This is further supported by the fact that ctenochasmatids are otherwise only found in formations representing depositional environments with calm water, such as lagoons and lakes. The Romualdo Formation preserves marine environment, which would be unusual for a ctenochasmatid to inhabit.

== Classification ==
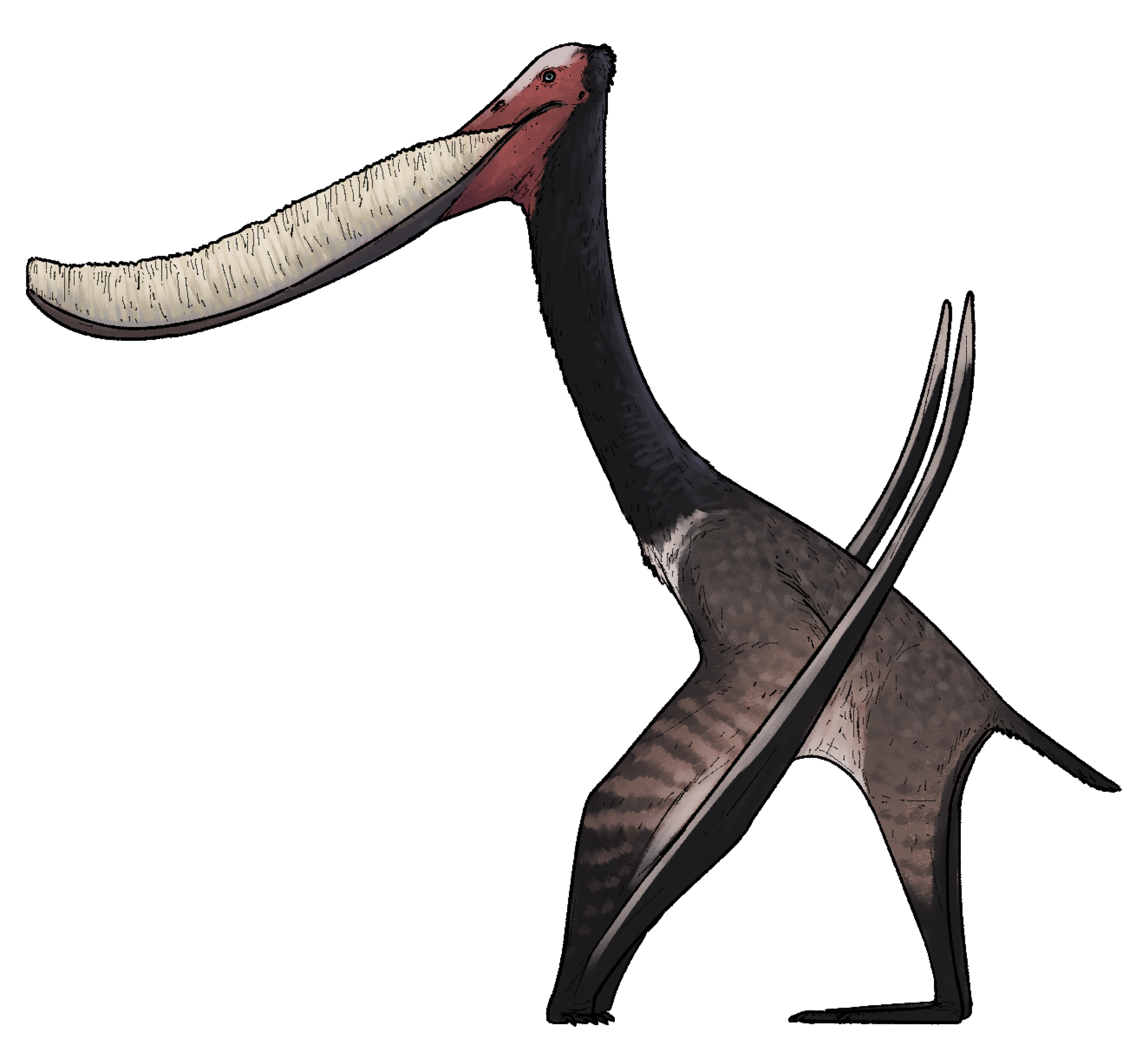
Speculative life restoration of the closely related Pterodaustro

In their 2025 description of Bakiribu, Pêgas and colleagues recovered this taxon as the sister taxon to Pterodaustro, forming the clade Pterodaustrini. These two genera are in turn sister to Ctenochasma spp., together forming the clade Ctenochasmatinae, which is a subset of the broader family Ctenochasmatidae. Beipiaopterus and Gegepterus, both of which have been traditionally regarded as pterodastrinins, were instead recovered as non-ctenochasmatine ctenochasmatids based on a reanalysis of their respective anatomies. These results are displayed in the cladogram below:

- Archaeopterodactyloidea
  - - Germanodactylus cristatus
    - Germanodactylus rhamphastinus
  - - Pterodactylus antiquus
    - - Diopecephalus kochi
      - Ctenochasmatoidea
        - - Normannognathus wellnhoferi
          - - Cycnorhamphus suevicus
            - Gallodactylus canjuersensis
        - - Aerodactylus scolopaciceps
          - Ctenochasmatidae
            - - - Ardeadactylus longicollum
                - Huanhepterus quingyangensis
              - - - Gladocephaloideus jingangshanensis
                  - Feilongus youngi
                  - Moganopterus zhuiana
                - - Elanodactylus prolatus
                  - - Forfexopterus jeholensis
                    - - Gegepterus changi
                      - Beipiaopterus chenianus
            - - - Liaodactylus primus
                - - Cathayopterus grabaui
                  - Pterofiltrus qiui
              - - Ctenochasmatinae
                  - - Ctenochasma elegans
                    - Ctenochasma taqueti
                  - Pterodaustrini
                    - Bakiribu waridza
                    - Pterodaustro guinazui
                - Gnathosaurinae
                  - Plataleorhynchus streptophorodon
                  - - - Lusognathus almadrava
                      - Garudapterus buffetauti
                    - - Gnathosaurus subulatus
                      - Tacuadactylus luciae

In 2026, David M. Unwin and colleagues published a reinterpretation of the putative 'jaw bones' of Bakiribu. They instead regarded them as the gill arch apparatus of a fish, possibly in the family Amiidae, and suggested the specimen does not represent a regurgitalite. Under this reinterpretation, the fossil material would not be diagnostic to a distinct species, making it a nomen dubium. Shortly thereafter, Brazilian paleontologist Alexander Kellner—the handling editor of the article by Unwin et al.—published an editorial note summarizing the issue. He noted that the paleohistology of the purported Bakiribu teeth performed by Pêgas et al. (2025) was not convincing evidence that the structures contain dental tissue. Kellner concluded that the currently available evidence suggests B. waridza is a fish, and that the species should be treated as an indeterminate member of Actinopterygii (ray-finned fishes) or a species inquirenda (a species requiring further investigation), pending further information. A follow-up study by Pêgas and colleagues was noted to be in preparation.

== Palaeoevironment ==
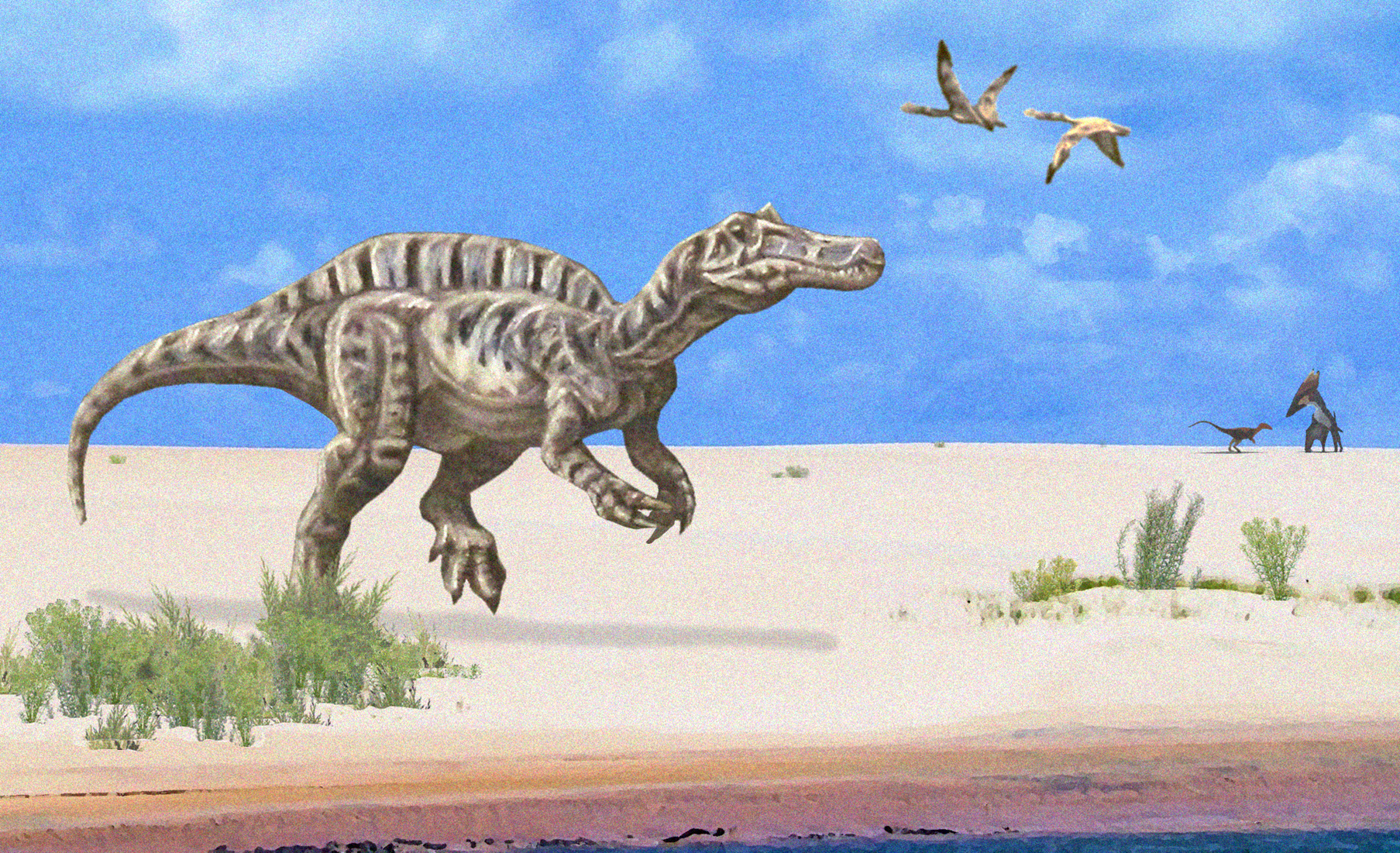
Restoration of the environment of the Romualdo Formation

Bakiribu lived in a marginal marine habitat. It lived alongside dinosaurs including the spinosaurids Irritator and its possible junior synonym Angaturama, and the smaller theropods Aratasaurus, Santanaraptor, and Mirischia.

Other animals known from the formation include the crocodylomorphs Araripesuchus and Caririsuchus, turtles such as Santanachelys, and many other pterosaurs such as Tropeognathus, Anhanguera and Tapejara.
