= Graphical timeline of pterosaurs =

Timeline showing the development of the extinct reptilian order Pterosauria from its appearance in the late Triassic period to its demise at the end of the Cretaceous, together with an alphabetical listing of pterosaur species and their geological ages.

== Data ==
- Angustinarhipterus longicephalus: Bathonian-Callovian
- Anhanguera blittersdorffi: Aptian-Albian
- Anhanguera cuvieri: Albian
- Anhanguera cuvieri: Cenomanian-Turonian
- Anhanguera cuvieri: Late Albian
- Anhanguera fittoni: late Albian
- Anhanguera santanae: Aptian-Albian
- Anurognathus ammoni: Tithonian
- Aralazhdarcho bostobensis: Santonian-early Campanian
- Arambourgiania philadelphiae: Maastrichtian
- Arcticodactylus cromptonellus: Norian–Rhaetian
- Arthurdactylus conandoylei: Late Aptian-early Albian
- Austriadactylus cristatus: Middle to late Norian
- Azhdarcho sp.: Early Santonian
- Azhdarcho lancicollis: Middle-late Turonian
- Bakonydraco galaczi: Santonian
- Batrachognathus volans: Oxfordian-Kimmeridgian
- Beipiaopterus chenianus: Late Barremian – early Aptian
- Boreopterus cuiae: late Barremian – early Aptian
- Brasileodactylus araripensis: Aptian-Albian
- Cacibupteryx caribensis: Middle-late Oxfordian
- Cathayopterus grabaui: late Barremian – early Aptian
- Campylognathoides sp.: Early Toarcian
- Campylognathoides indicus: Pliensbachian-Toarcian
- Campylognathoides liasicus: Early Toarcian
- Campylognathoides zitteli: Early Toarcian
- Caulkicephalus trimicrodon: Barremian
- Caviramus schesaplanensis: Late Norian or early Rhaetian
- Cearadactylus atrox: Aptian-Albian
- Chaoyangopterus zhangi: Aptian
- Coloborhynchus clavirostris: Late Berriasian – Valanginian
- Coloborhynchus moroccensis: Early Cenomanian
- cf. Coloborhynchus sp: Late Cenomanian
- Coloborhynchus robustus: Aptian-Albian
- Coloborhynchus sedgwickii: Late Albian
- Coloborhynchus spielburgi: Aptian-Albian
- Coloborhynchus wadleighi: Late Albian
- Ctenochasma elegens: Tithonian
- Ctenochasma roemeri: Berriasian
- Ctenochasma taqueti: Early Tithonian
- Cycnorhamphus canjuersensis: Early Tithonian
- Cycnorhamphus suevicus: Late Kimmeridgian
- Cycnorhamphus suevicus: Tithonian
- Dendrorhynchoides curvidentatus: Late Barremian – early Aptian
- Dimorphodon macronyx: Late Sinemurian
- Dimorphodon weintraubi: Early Middle Jurassic
- Domeykodactylus ceciliae: Lower Cretaceous
- Dorygnathus cf. D. banthensis: Early Toarcian
- Dorygnathus banthensis: Early Toarcian
- Dorygnathus mistelgauensis: Early Toarcian
- Dsungaripterus weii: ?Valanginian-Albian
- Eosipterus yangi: late Barremian – early Aptian
- Eudimorphodon cf. E. ranzii: Middle to late Norian
- Eudimorphodon ranzii: Late Norian
- Eudimorphodon rosenfeldi: Late Norian
- Eudimorphodon sp.: Late Carnian
- Feilongus youngi: late Barremian – early Aptian
- Gegepterus changi: late Barremian – early Aptian
- Germanodactylus: Kimmeridgian
- Germanodactylus cristatus: Tithonian
- Germanodactylus rhamphastinus: Tithonian
- Gnathosaurus macrurus: Berriasian
- Gnathosaurus subulatus: Tithonian
- Haopterus gracilis: late Barremian – early Aptian
- Hatzegopteryx thambema: Late Maastrichtian
- Herbstosaurus pigmaeus: Middle-late Tithonian
- Huanhepterus quingyangensis: Late Jurassic
- Huaxipterus benxiensis: Aptian
- Huaxipterus corollatus: Aptian
- Istiodactylus latidens: Barremian
- Istiodactylus sinensis: Aptian
- Jeholopterus ningchengensis: Bathonian-Callovian
- Jidapterus edentus: Aptian
- Kepodactylus insperatus: Kimmeridgian-Tithonian
- Liaoningopterus gui: Aptian
- Liaoxipterus brachyognathus: Aptian
- Lonchodectes compressirostris: Cenomanian-Turonian
- Lonchodectes compressirostris: Late Albian
- Lonchodectes giganteus: Cenomanian-Turonian
- Lonchodectes microdon: Late Albian
- Lonchodectes platystomus: Albian
- Lonchodectes platystomus: Late Albian
- Lonchodectes sagittirostris: Late Berriasian – Valanginian
- Lonchognathosaurus acutirostris: ?Aptian-Albian
- Ludodactylus sibbicki: Late Aptian-early Albian
- Mesadactylus ornithosphyos: Kimmeridgian-Tithonian
- Montanazhdarcho minor: Middle-late Campanian
- Muzquizopterix coahuilensis: Early Coniacian
- Nemicolopterus crypticus: Aptian
- Nesodactylus hesperius: Middle-late Oxfordian
- Noripterus complicidens: ?Valanginian-Albian
- Normannognathus wellnhoferi: Late Kimmeridgian
- Nurhachius ignaciobritoi: Aptian
- Nyctosaurus gracilis: Late Santonian-early Campanian
- Nyctosaurus lamegoi: Maastrichtian
- Nyctosaurus nanus: Late Coniacian-early Santonian
- Ornithocheirus sp.: Albian
- cf. Ornithocheirus sp.: Early Barremian
- Ornithocheirus sp.: Early Cenomanian
- Ornithocheirus mesembrinus: Aptian-Albian
- Ornithocheirus simus: Late Albian
- Ornithostoma sedgwicki: Late Albian
- Parapsicephalus purdoni Early Toarcian
- Peteinosaurus zambelli: Late Norian
- Phosphatodraco mauritanicus: Maastrichtian
- Plataleorhynchus streptorophodon: Berriasian
- Preondactylus buffarinii: Late Norian
- Pteranodon sternbergi: Late Coniacian-early Santonian
- Pteranodon longiceps: Late Santonian-early Campanian
- Pteranodon longiceps: Early Campanian
- Pterodactylus antiquus: Tithonian
- Pterodactylus longicollum: Late Kimmeridgian
- Pterodactylus longicollum: Tithonian
- Pterodactylus micronyx: Tithonian
- Pterodaustro guinazui: Aptian
- Pterodaustro guinazui: Albian
- Pterorhynchus wellnhoferi: Bathonian-Callovian
- Quetzalcoatlus: Late Maastrichtian
- Quetzalcoatlus northropi: Late Maastrichtian
- Rhamphinion jenkinsi: Sinemurian-Pliensbachian
- Rhamphocephalus sp. Early Bathonian
- Rhamphocephalus sp.: Middle Bathonian
- Rhamphocephalus bucklandi: Early Bathonian
- Rhamphocephalus bucklandi: Middle Bathonian
- Rhamphocephalus sp.: Late Bathonian
- Rhamphorhynchus sp.: Late Callovian
- Rhamphorhynchus muensteri: Late Kimmeridgian
- Rhamphorhynchus muensteri: Tithonian
- Scaphognathus crassirostris: Tithonian
- Sinopterus dongi: Aptian
- Sinopterus gui: Aptian
- Sordes pilosus: Oxfordian-Kimmeridgian
- Tapejara wellnhoferi: Aptian-Albian
- Tendaguripterus recki: : Late Kimmeridgian-Tithonian
- Thalassodromeus sethi: Aptian-Albian
- Tupundactylus imperator: Late Aptian-early Albian
- Tupundactylus navigans: late Aptian-early Albian
- Tupuxaura leonardi: Aptian-Albian
- Tupuxuara longicristatus: Aptian-Albian
- Zhejiangopterus linhaiensis: Early Campanian

== See also ==
- List of pterosaur genera
- Phylogeny of pterosaurs
