= Cathayopterus =

Cathayopterus Temporal range: Early Cretaceous, 122 Ma

Scientific classification
- Kingdom: Animalia
- Phylum: Chordata
- Class: Reptilia
- Order: †Pterosauria
- Suborder: †Pterodactyloidea
- Family: †Ctenochasmatidae
- Genus: †Cathayopterus; Wang & Zhou, 2006

Type species
- †Cathayopterus grabaui Wang & Zhou, 2006

Genus of ctenochasmatid pterosaur from the Early Cretaceous

Cathayopterus is an extinct genus of ctenochasmatid pterosaur from the Early Cretaceous-age Yixian Formation of Liaoning, China. The name means "China wing", using the word "Cathay" as an old alternative name for China. The type species is C. grabaui, described in 2006 by Wang Xiaolin and Zhou Zhonghe. The species name honors the late American geologist Amadeus W. Grabau, a pioneer in the study of the Jehol Biota. It is a member of the Ctenochasmatidae, a clade of mostly filter feeding pterosaurs from the Jurassic and early Cretaceous.

== Description ==
Cathayopterus is only known from a skull (IVPP V13756) preserved in dorsal view, which shows teeth splaying outwards at the tip of the rostrum, similar to Ctenochasma. The skull is incomplete, with the left side being damaged.

== Classification ==
The cladogram below follows a phylogenetic analysis upheld by Lü and colleagues in 2016. They recovered Cathayopterus as a basal member of the family Ctenochasmatidae.

- Ctenochasmatidae
  - Cathayopterus
  - Pterodaustro
  - Ctenochasma
  - Gegepterus
  - Eosipterus
  - - Cearadactylus
    - Gnathosaurus
    - Pterodactylus longicolum
  - - - Pterofiltrus
      - Gladocephaloideus
    - - Elanodactylus
      - Beipiaopterus
      - Feilongus
      - Moganopterus

== Paleobiology ==
Cathayopterus was likely a filter feeder, just like other ctenochasmatid pterosaurs. It likely roamed around waterways to feed.

== See also ==
- List of pterosaur genera
- Timeline of pterosaur research
