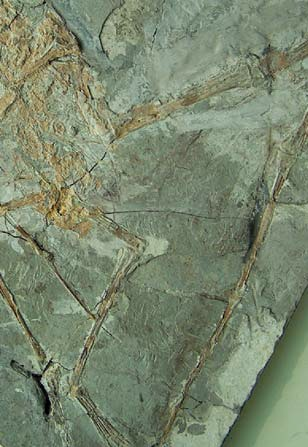
- Holotype specimen of E. yangi

Scientific classification
- Kingdom: Animalia
- Phylum: Chordata
- Class: Reptilia
- Order: †Pterosauria
- Suborder: †Pterodactyloidea
- Family: †Ctenochasmatidae
- Tribe: †Pterodaustrini
- Genus: †Eosipterus; Ji & Ji, 1997

Type species
- †Eosipterus yangi Ji & Ji, 1997

= Eosipterus =

Eosipterus Temporal range: Early Cretaceous, 124.6 Ma

Genus of ctenochasmatid pterosaur from the Early Cretaceous

Eosipterus is an extinct genus of ctenochasmatid pterosaur from the Early Cretaceous period of Liaoning, China. Fossil remains dated back to the Aptian stage, 125 million years ago.

== History and etymology ==
The genus was named in 1997 by Ji Shu'an and Ji Qiang. The type species is Eosipterus yangi. The genus name is derived from Greek eos, "dawn" and Greek pteron, "wing" with a Latin ending; and a grammar error: normally the combination would have resulted in "eopterus". The "dawn" element refers to its age but also to China being "in the east". The specific name honours paleontologist Yang Daihuan.

The genus is based on the holotype specimen, GMV2117, found near Jinggangshan in western Liaoning Province, in the Yixian Formation. It was the first pterosaur discovered in that region. It consists of a partial crushed skeleton of a subadult individual on a slab, lacking skull and neck. Most vertebrae have been severely damaged and even their number cannot be determined. The authors state that eighteen detached belly ribs are present in the matrix.

== Description ==
=== Postcranial skeleton ===
The wings are robust and elongated. The wing finger has the standard four phalanges, a difference from the possibly related Beipiaopterus which has lost the fourth phalanx. Total wingspan was about 1.2 meters (3.9 ft).

The pelvis is not well preserved. The femur has a length of 6 centimeters (2.4 in); the tibia of 96 millimeters (3.8 in). The fibula is strongly reduced. The foot claws are slightly curved; the fifth toe has been reduced to a single claw.

== Classification ==
The authors placed Eosipterus in a general Pterodactyloidea incertae sedis; in 1999 a placement within Pterodactylidae was suggested, and even a synonymy with Pterodactylus was proposed within a hypothesis that the lower Yixian Formation dated from the Late Jurassic. A cladistic study in 2006 found that it was a member of the Ctenochasmatidae — David Unwin more precisely assigned it to the Ctenochasmatinae.

Below is cladogram following a topology by Andres, Clark and Xu (2014). In the analysis, they recovered Eosipterus within the family Ctenochasmatidae, more precisely within the tribe Pterodaustrini, placed in a more derived position than Pterodaustro.

- Ctenochasmatidae
  - Ctenochasmatinae
    - Ctenochasma
    - Pterodaustrini
      - Pterodaustro guinazui
      - - Eosipterus yangi
        - - Beipiaopterus chenianus
          - Gegepterus changi
  - - Kepodactylus insperatus
    - - Elanodactylus prolatus
      - - Moganopterinae
          - Feilongus youngi
          - Moganopterus zhuiana
        - Gnathosaurinae
          - Huanhepterus quingyangensis
          - - Plataleorhynchus streptophorodon
            - - Gnathosaurus subulatus
              - Gnathosaurus macrurus

== See also ==
- List of pterosaur genera
- Timeline of pterosaur research
