= Kepodactylus =

Kepodactylus Temporal range: Late Jurassic, Kimmeridgian–Tithonian

Scientific classification
- Kingdom: Animalia
- Phylum: Chordata
- Class: Reptilia
- Order: †Pterosauria
- Suborder: †Pterodactyloidea
- Family: †Ctenochasmatidae
- Genus: †Kepodactylus; Harris & Carpenter, 1996
- Species: †K. insperatus

Binomial name
- †Kepodactylus insperatus Harris & Carpenter, 1996

Genus of ctenochasmatid pterosaur from the Late Jurassic

Kepodactylus is an extinct genus of ctenochasmatid pterodactyloid pterosaur from the Kimmeridgian-Tithonian-age Upper Jurassic Morrison Formation of Colorado, United States.

== Discovery and naming ==
In 1992, a team from the Denver Museum of Natural History dug up a specimen of the dinosaur Stegosaurus stenops in Garden Park, Colorado. In the quarry they also found smaller disarticulated bones from other animals, among which were those of a pterosaur new to science.

In 1996, Jerald Harris and Kenneth Carpenter named the new genus. The type species is Kepodactylus insperatus. The genus name is derived from Greek, kepos, "garden", a reference to Garden Park and daktylos, "finger", referring to the typical wing finger of pterosaurs. The specific name means "unhoped-for" in Latin, alluding to the fact that the researchers hoped to find a dinosaur, and did not expect a pterosaur.

The species is based on the holotype DMNH 21684, consisting of a cervical vertebra, the left humerus, several finger bones, and a metatarsal. Kepodactylus was similar to Mesadactylus but with a larger wingspan of around 2.5 m [8.2 ft] and with additional pneumatic foramina (holes to allow air from air sacks to enter the bones) in the vertebrae and humerus. The describers concluded that the species was a member of the Pterodactyloidea and within this group, using the phylogeny of David Unwin, a member of a clade that is now known as Lophocratia. It was regarded as a potentially valid genus in the most recent review of Morrison pterosaurs.

== Description ==
The cervical vertebra of Kepodactylus that was found is missing most of the neural spine and a portion of the left posterolateral corner compromising the left postzygapophisis, the authors also noted that it is crushed dorsoventrally and that it is procoelous. The centrum is elongated, akin to that of the vertebrae of Pterodactylus, it also does not show signs of having possessed diaphophyses, a feature typical of other members of pterodactyloidea, the authors also noted that the postzygapophysis extend beyond the posterior-most exent of the centrum, a feature typical of non-pterodactyloid pterosaurs and more derived pterodactyloids. The neural spine of Kepodactylus is missing but it most was most likely low and thin, like other pterodactyloids. The cervical vertebra also possess pneumatic foramina, the right foramen sits directly ventrally of the right transverse process, meanwhile the left foramen has been obliterated by compaction.

The left humerus that was recovered is virtually complete, lacking only the distal prominence of the deltopectoral crest, but it is also crushed and the distal third is damaged, the articular head of the humerus is also "saddle-shaped", a feature typical of pterosaurs. The authors described the deltopectoral crest as "quite large and rectangular in shape" a feature typical of more basal pterodactyloids and azhdarchids, the deltopectoral crest is also longer than it is deep. The authors also noted that the size of the deltopectoral crest relative to the main body of the humerus is more comparable to that of non-pterodactyloid pterosaurs and azhdarchids rather than Pterodactylus. The humerus also possess a pneumatic foramen on its dorsal edge, a feature reported in both non-pterodactyloid pterosaurus such as the rhamphorhynchid Dorygnathus banthensis and more derived pterodactyloid pterosaurs such as: Santanadactylus; Tapejara and Tupuxuara. The authors also noted that the foramen is located more laterally than in the more derived pterodactyloids and that it may represent an autapomorphy.

The proximal wing finger phalanx in Kepodactylus is most similar in morphology to that of Rhamphorhynchus. The cross-section of the proximal wing finger phalanx is ovoid in cross section, a feature typical of pterodactyloids, and it does not possess a longitudinal furrow where the brachiopatagium would have attached, a feature typical of non-pterodactyloid pterosaurs.

The metatarsal that was found of Kepodactylus is morphologically very similar to the metatarsal of digit IV of Dimorphodon, a dimorphodontid pterosaur.

In 2022 Gregory S. Paul estimated its mass at 10 kg (~22 lbs).

== Classification ==
The cladogram below shows a phylogenetic analysis published by Longrich, Martill, and Andres in 2018. They recovered Kepodactylus as a basal member of the family Ctenochasmatidae.

- Ctenochasmatidae
  - Ctenochasmatinae
    - Ctenochasma
    - Pterodaustrini
      - Pterodaustro
      - - Beipiaopterus
        - Gegepterus
  - - Kepodactylus
    - - Moganopterinae
        - Moganopterus
        - Feilongus
      - - Ardeadactylus
        - - Elanodactylus
          - Gnathosaurinae
            - Huanhepterus
            - - Plataleorhynchus
              - Gnathosaurus

== See also ==
- List of pterosaur genera
- Timeline of pterosaur research
