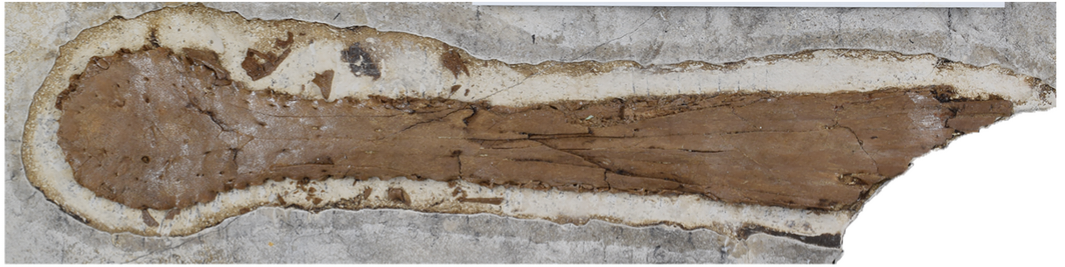
- Holotype jaw of Plataleorhynchus streptophorodon

Scientific classification
- Kingdom: Animalia
- Phylum: Chordata
- Class: Reptilia
- Order: †Pterosauria
- Suborder: †Pterodactyloidea
- Family: †Ctenochasmatidae
- Subfamily: †Gnathosaurinae
- Genus: †Plataleorhynchus; Howse & Milner, 1995

Type species
- †Plataleorhynchus streptophorodon Howse & Milner, 1995

= Plataleorhynchus =

Plataleorhynchus Temporal range: Tithonian–Berriasian

Genus of ctenochasmatid pterosaur from the Late Jurassic and Early Cretaceous

Plataleorhynchus is a genus of ctenochasmatid pterodactyloid pterosaur from the Late Jurassic to Early Cretaceous periods (Tithonian to Berriasian stages) of what is now the Purbeck Group of Dorset, England.

== History and etymology ==
Plataleorhynchus is based on holotype NHMUK PV R 11957 (earlier BMNH R.11957), an incomplete anterior upper jaw with teeth found in a chalkstone quarry near Langton Matravers. The fossil is present on a plate; its underside is visible. It was previously part of the Corfe Castle Museum and then the Dorset County Museum during the 1950s before the Natural History Museum purchased the specimen in 1958. It was undescribed prior to 1995.

The genus was named in 1995 by Stafford Howse and Andrew Milner. The type species is Plataleorhynchus streptophorodon. The genus name is derived from Platalea, the spoonbill, and Greek rhynchos, "snout", in reference to the distinctive form of the front of the skull. The specific name is derived from Greek streptophoros, "collared", and odon, "tooth", referring to the tooth form.

It is notable because it expands to form a circular, spatula-like shape at the front, holding 22 narrow teeth that point sideways. Forty other teeth (sockets) were present in the preserved remainder of the snout; the total for the upper jaws was estimated at 76.

== Description ==
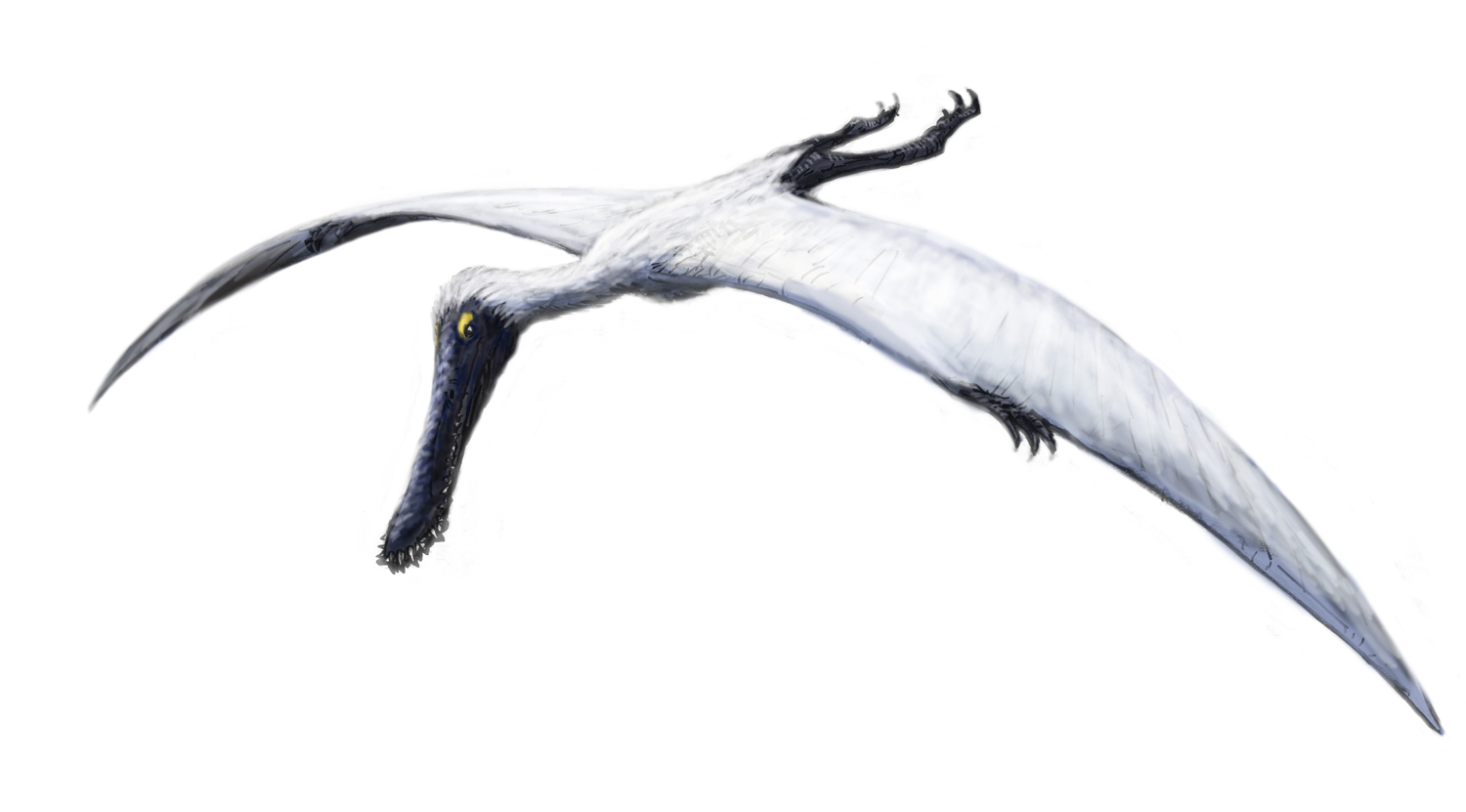
Life restoration

Although Plataleorhychus would have been similar in size to large gnathosaurines like Gnathosaurus, its skull length was estimated at a minimum of 40 centimeters (15.75 in), the different shape of its spoonbill, presence of an apparently horn-covered pad on the palate, and smaller teeth suggest it did not feed in the same way, perhaps stirring up water-dwelling animals from muddy or weedy environments.

== Classification ==
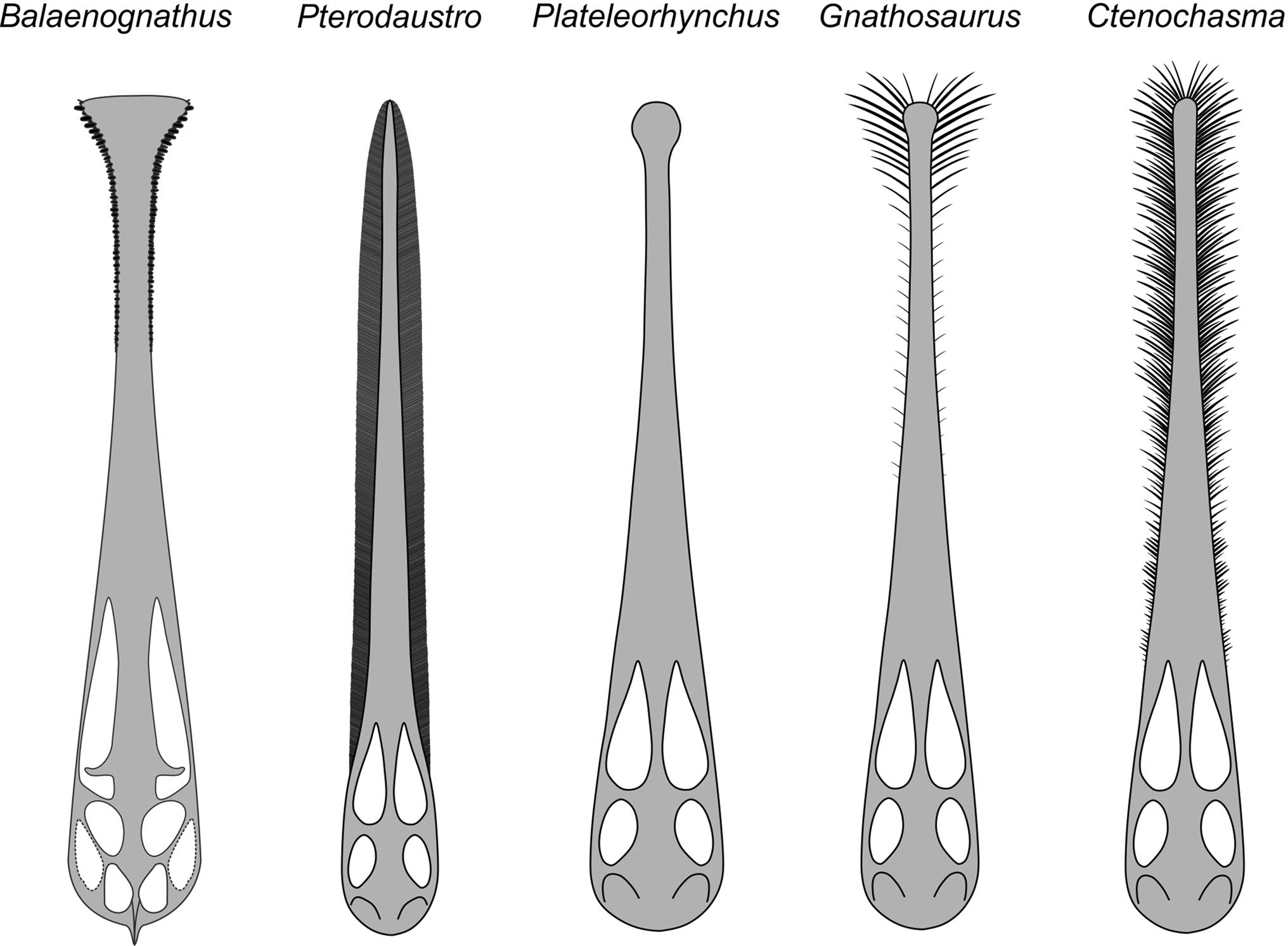
Jaws of various ctenochasmatid pterosaurs, including Plataleorhynchus at center and close relative Gnathosaurus centre left

The authors classified Plataleorhynchus as a member of the Ctenochasmatidae, a group containing many filter feeders. David Unwin in 2005 placed it in the subgroup of the Gnathosaurinae.

Below is a result of a phylogenetic analysis from a 2025 study by Sita Manitkoon and colleagues, finding Plataleorhynchus outside of the grouping of all other gnathosaurines:

- Ctenochasmatidae
  - - - Huanhepterus
      - - Aurorazhdarcho
        - Ardeadactylus
    - - - Elanodactylus
        - Forfexopterus
      - - Gladocephaloideus
        - - Feilongus
          - Moganopterus
  - - - Liaodactylus
      - - Pterofiltrus
        - Cathayopterus
    - - Gnathosaurinae
        - Plataleorhynchus
        - - - Lusognathus
            - Garudapterus
          - - Gnathosaurus
            - Tacuadactylus
      - - - Pterodaustro
          - - Gegepterus
            - Beipiaopterus
        - Ctenochasma

== See also ==
- List of pterosaur genera
- Timeline of pterosaur research
