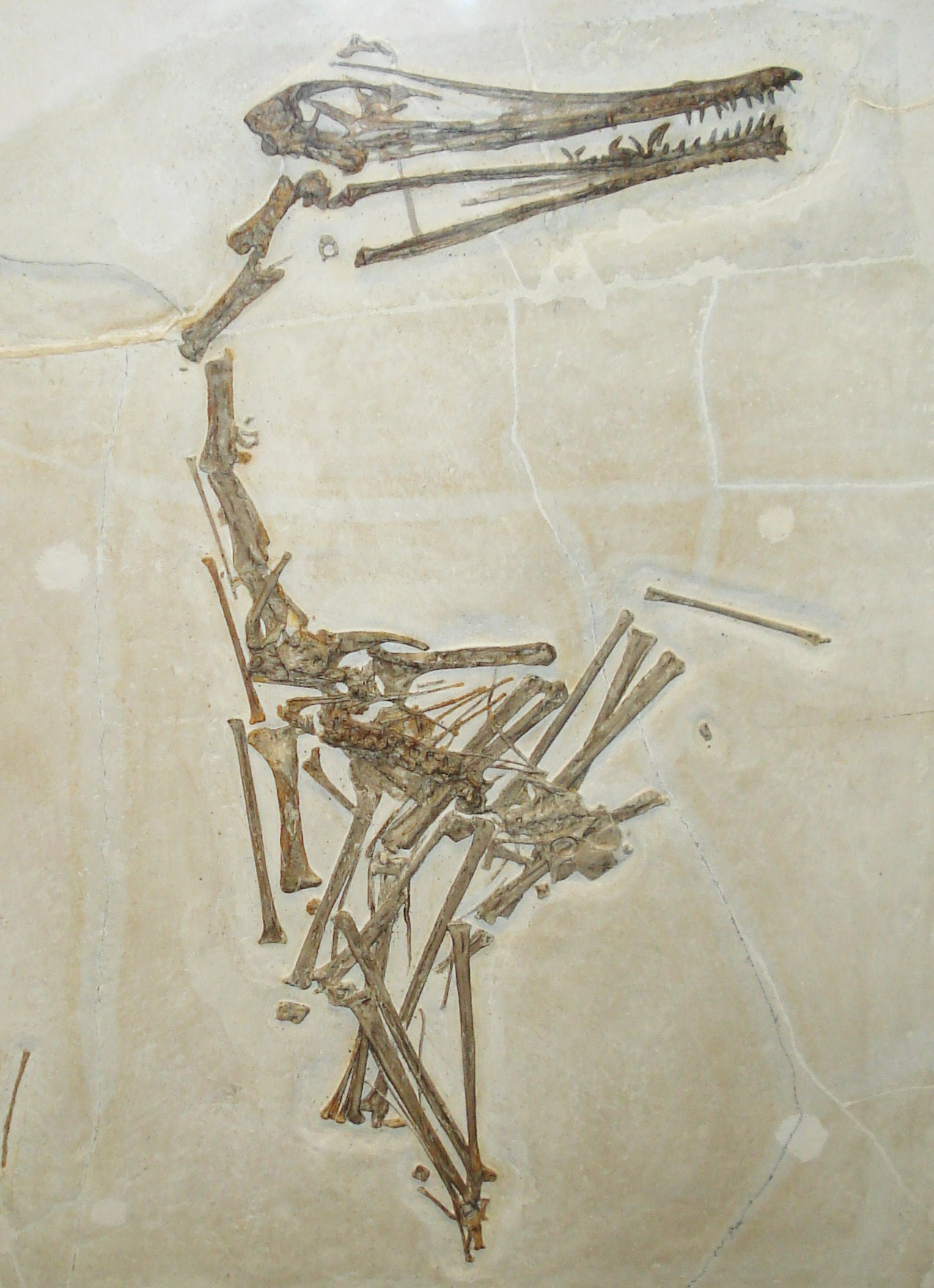
- SMNS 56603, the neotype

Scientific classification
- Kingdom: Animalia
- Phylum: Chordata
- Class: Reptilia
- Order: †Pterosauria
- Suborder: †Pterodactyloidea
- Clade: †Euctenochasmatia
- Clade: †Ctenochasmatoidea
- Genus: †Ardeadactylus; Bennett, 2013
- Species: †A. longicollum

Binomial name
- †Ardeadactylus longicollum (Meyer, 1854)

Synonyms
- List: Pterodactylus longipes Münster, 1836; Pterodactylus longicollum Meyer, 1854; Diopecephalus longicollum (Meyer, 1854); Pterodactylus (Ornithocephalus) vulturinus Wagner, 1857; Pterodactylus vulturinus (Wagner, 1857); Pterodactylus suevicus Fraas, 1878 non Quenstedt, 1855; Cycnorhamphus fraasi Seeley, 1901; Pterodactylus fraasi (Seeley, 1901)

= Ardeadactylus =

Ardeadactylus Temporal range: Late Jurassic, 152 Ma

Genus of ctenochasmatoid pterosaur from the Late Jurassic

Ardeadactylus (from Ardea – meaning "heron", and also a name of a genus of herons – and dactylus, meaning "finger") is an extinct genus of ctenochasmatoid pterosaur known from the Upper Jurassic Solnhofen limestone of Bavaria, southern Germany. It contains a single species, Ardeadactylus longicollum, which was originally thought to be a species of Pterodactylus, as P. longicollum.

== History ==
Only two specimens of Ardeadactylus are known to exist currently: SMNS 56603 (earlier SMNS 5802) found in 1874, a specimen from Nusplingen initially thought to belong to the species Pterodactylus suevicus (currently Cycnorhamphus), and the neotype of the species, JME-SOS 2428, a specimen held at Jura Museum in Eichstätt. Other known specimens, including the holotype designated by Christian Erich Hermann von Meyer when he named the type species Pterodactylus longicollum in 1854, were lost during World War II. The original holotype, consisting of the skull, neck and anterior torso, had been found near Eichstätt in 1853 and was that year acquired for the Herzoglich Leuchtenbergische Naturalien-Kabinett by Professor Ludwig Frischmann. Its destruction motivated Peter Wellnhofer to assign a neotype in 1970.

== Description ==
Ardeadactylus is suspected to be a heron–like, long–necked long–legged piscivore. It was similar to Pterodactylus antiquus in its general body form, but seems to have been larger. Bennett (2013) estimated the wingspan of the neotype specimen to be 1.45 meters (4.8 ft); the referred specimen from the Jura Museum is more or less 10% larger. A. longicollum had fewer, fifteen per jaw, and relatively larger teeth than P. antiquus, possibly indicating that it preyed on larger fish than Pterodactylus.

== Classification ==
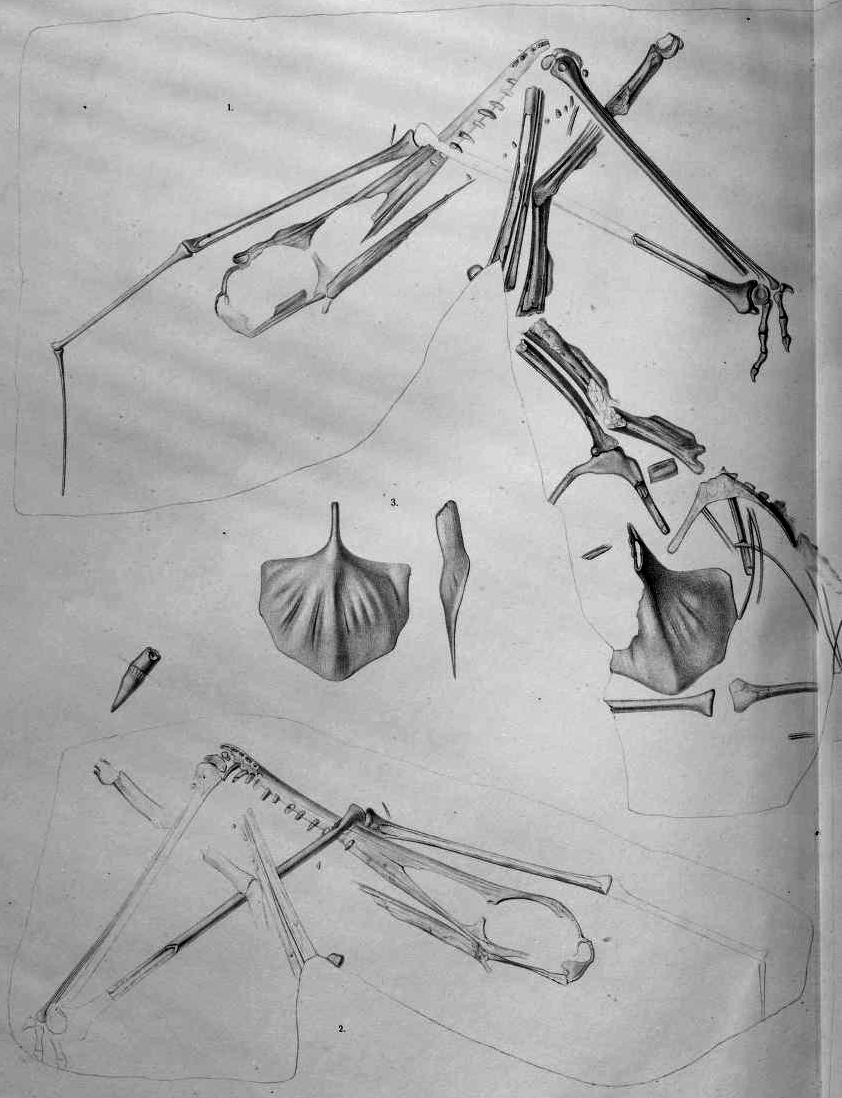
Illustration of the lost holotype from 1860

In 2017, a phylogenetic analysis by Steven Vidovic and David Martill found Ardeadactylus within the family Aurorazhdarchidae, sister taxon to Aurorazhdarcho. Their cladogram is shown below:

- Ctenochasmatoidea
  - Aurorazhdarchia
    - Aerodactylus
    - - Aurorazhdarchidae
        - Huanhepterus
        - - Ardeadactylus
          - Aurorazhdarcho
      - Gallodactylidae
        - Cycnorhamphus
        - Moganopterinae
          - Feilongus
          - Moganopterus
  - Ctenochasmatidae

In 2018 however, Nicholas Longrich and colleagues had recovered a different set of relationships for ctenochasmatoids. In their analysis, Ardeadactylus was recovered within the Ctenochasmatidae instead. Their cladogram is shown below.

- Ctenochasmatidae
  - Ctenochasmatinae
    - Ctenochasma
    - Pterodaustrini
      - Pterodaustro
      - - Beipiaopterus
        - Gegepterus
  - - Kepodactylus
    - - Moganopterinae
        - Moganopterus
        - Feilongus
      - - Ardeadactylus
        - - Elanodactylus
          - Gnathosaurinae
            - Huanhepterus
            - - Plataleorhynchus
              - Gnathosaurus

== See also ==
- Timeline of pterosaur research
