= Beipiao =

County-level city in Liaoning, China

Beipiao 北票市
- County-level city
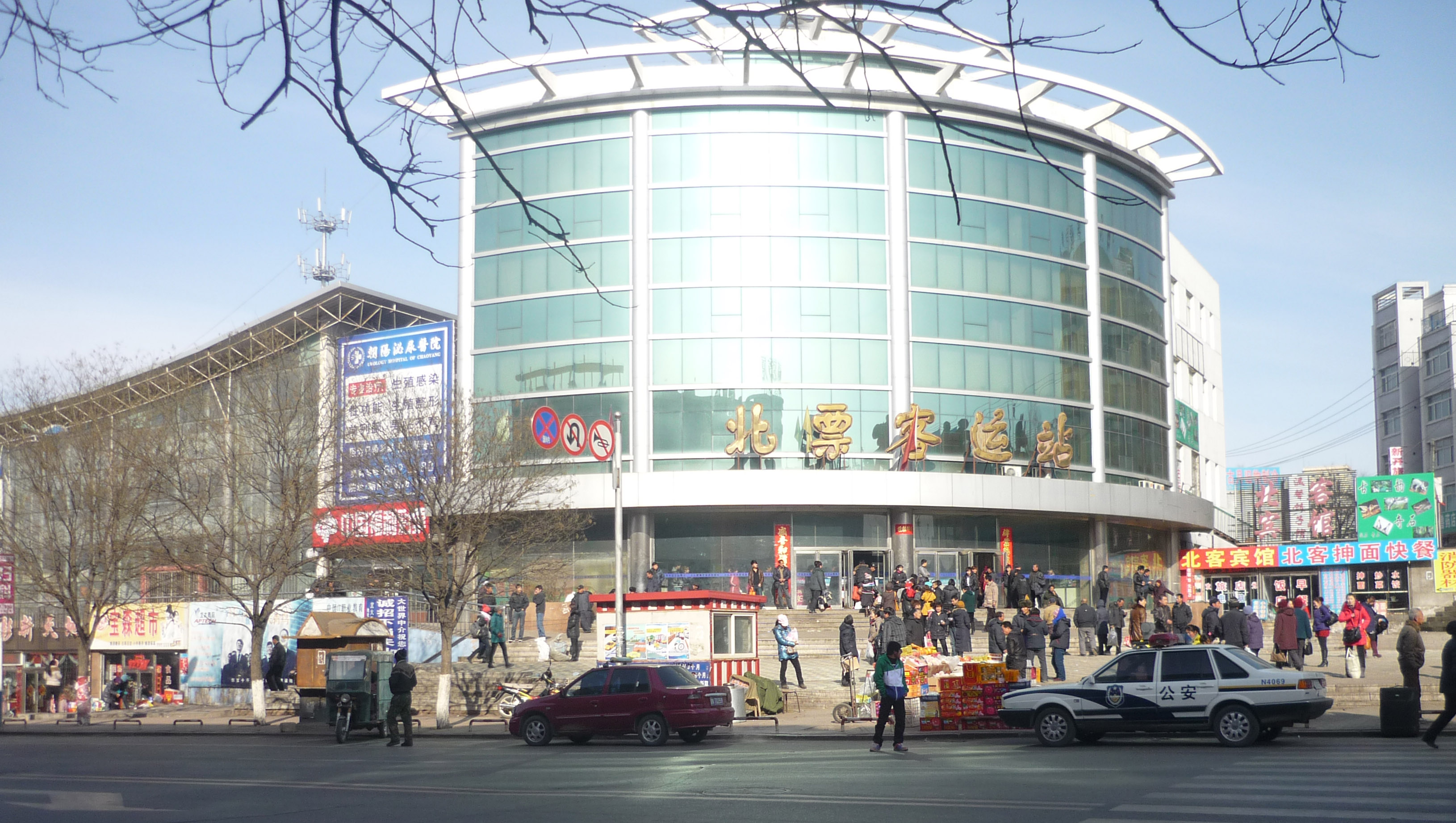
- Beipiao Bus Station

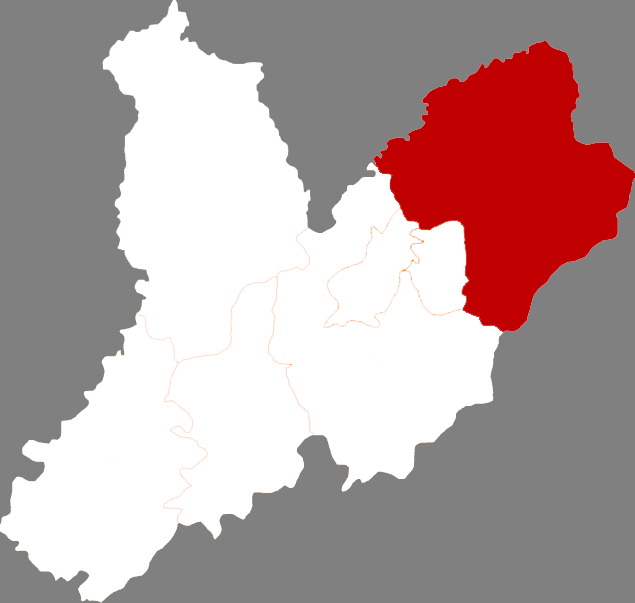
- Location in Chaoyang City

- Location in Liaoning
- Coordinates: 41.801°N 120.771°E
- Country: People's Republic of China
- Province: Liaoning
- Prefecture-level city: Chaoyang

Area
  - County-level city: 4,469.0 km^{2} (1,725.5 sq mi)
  - Urban: 183.00 km^{2} (70.66 sq mi)

Population (2020 census)
  - County-level city: 439,998
  - Urban: 190,315
- Time zone: UTC+8 (China Standard)

Beipiao (Chinese: 北票; pinyin: Běipiào; Wade–Giles: Pei^{3}-p'iao^{4}) is a city in Chaoyang prefecture, Liaoning province, in Northeast China. It has a population of 202,807. The main industry in the area is coal mining. With vertical shafts of almost 1000m, these are some of the deepest coal mines in China. The coal produced is used for coking. Daheishan National Forest Park is located in the northwestern part of Beipiao city.

The dinosaur Beipiaosaurus was named after the city where its fossils were found nearby.

== Administrative Divisions ==
There are 7 subdistricts, 7 towns, 17 townships, and 2 ethnic townships under the administration of the city.

Subdistricts:

- Nanshan Subdistrict (南山街道), Taiji Subdistrict (台吉街道), Sanbao Subdistrict (三宝街道), Qiaobei Subdistrict (桥北街道), Chengguan Subdistrict (城关街道), Guanshan Subdistrict (冠山街道), Dongtaiji Subdistrict (东台吉街道)

Towns:

- Baoguolao (宝国老镇), Heichengzi (黑城子镇), Xiguanying (西官营镇), Shangyuan (上园镇), Wujianfang (五间房镇), Daban (大板镇), Taohuatu (桃花吐镇)

Townships:

- Dongguanying Township (东官营乡), Sanbao Township (三宝乡), Quanjuyong Township (泉巨永乡), Sanbaoying Township (三宝营乡), Beitazi Township (北塔子乡), Taijiying Township (台吉营乡), Loujiadian Township (娄家店乡), Beisijia Township (北四家乡), Changheying Township (常河营乡), Xiaotazi Township (小塔子乡), Dasanjiazi Township (大三家子乡), Mengguying Township (蒙古营乡), Longtan Township (龙潭乡), Changgao Township (长皋乡), Batuying Township (巴图营乡), Ha'ernao Township (哈尔脑乡), Zhangguying Township (章吉营乡), Liangshuihe Mongol Ethnic Township (凉水河蒙古族乡), Mayouying Manchu Ethnic Township (马友营蒙古族乡)

== Climate ==
Climate data for Beipiao, elevation 254 m (833 ft), (1991–2020 normals, extremes 1981–2010)
Month	Jan	Feb	Mar	Apr	May	Jun	Jul	Aug	Sep	Oct	Nov	Dec	Year
Record high °C (°F)	12.8 (55.0)	20.3 (68.5)	28.7 (83.7)	33.9 (93.0)	40.4 (104.7)	41.1 (106.0)	42.3 (108.1)	40.1 (104.2)	35.2 (95.4)	30.1 (86.2)	22.3 (72.1)	17.5 (63.5)	42.3 (108.1)
Mean daily maximum °C (°F)	−2.4 (27.7)	2.1 (35.8)	9.4 (48.9)	18.4 (65.1)	25.2 (77.4)	28.5 (83.3)	30.2 (86.4)	29.4 (84.9)	25.2 (77.4)	17.3 (63.1)	6.7 (44.1)	−0.9 (30.4)	15.8 (60.4)
Daily mean °C (°F)	−9.2 (15.4)	−4.9 (23.2)	2.5 (36.5)	11.5 (52.7)	18.5 (65.3)	22.4 (72.3)	24.9 (76.8)	23.6 (74.5)	18.3 (64.9)	10.3 (50.5)	0.4 (32.7)	−7.3 (18.9)	9.2 (48.6)
Mean daily minimum °C (°F)	−14.7 (5.5)	−10.7 (12.7)	−3.7 (25.3)	4.9 (40.8)	11.8 (53.2)	16.9 (62.4)	20.2 (68.4)	18.6 (65.5)	12.0 (53.6)	4.0 (39.2)	−5.0 (23.0)	−12.5 (9.5)	3.5 (38.3)
Record low °C (°F)	−28.2 (−18.8)	−23.5 (−10.3)	−17.9 (−0.2)	−8.0 (17.6)	−0.2 (31.6)	6.3 (43.3)	13.0 (55.4)	9.0 (48.2)	0.1 (32.2)	−8.9 (16.0)	−18.7 (−1.7)	−25.8 (−14.4)	−28.2 (−18.8)
Average precipitation mm (inches)	1.5 (0.06)	1.9 (0.07)	6.7 (0.26)	21.7 (0.85)	47.2 (1.86)	89.7 (3.53)	125.5 (4.94)	94.9 (3.74)	35.0 (1.38)	22.8 (0.90)	9.3 (0.37)	1.6 (0.06)	457.8 (18.02)
Average precipitation days (≥ 0.1 mm)	1.7	1.4	2.4	5.0	7.6	10.9	11.0	9.4	5.6	4.2	2.6	1.5	63.3
Average snowy days	2.0	2.2	2.2	0.9	0	0	0	0	0	0.4	2.3	2.0	12
Average relative humidity (%)	47	42	37	39	45	62	74	75	64	55	51	50	53
Mean monthly sunshine hours	213.0	216.7	258.7	252.4	278.0	239.9	223.3	243.1	247.5	227.2	193.5	193.2	2,786.5
Percentage possible sunshine	72	72	70	63	62	53	49	57	67	67	66	68	64
Source: China Meteorological Administration
