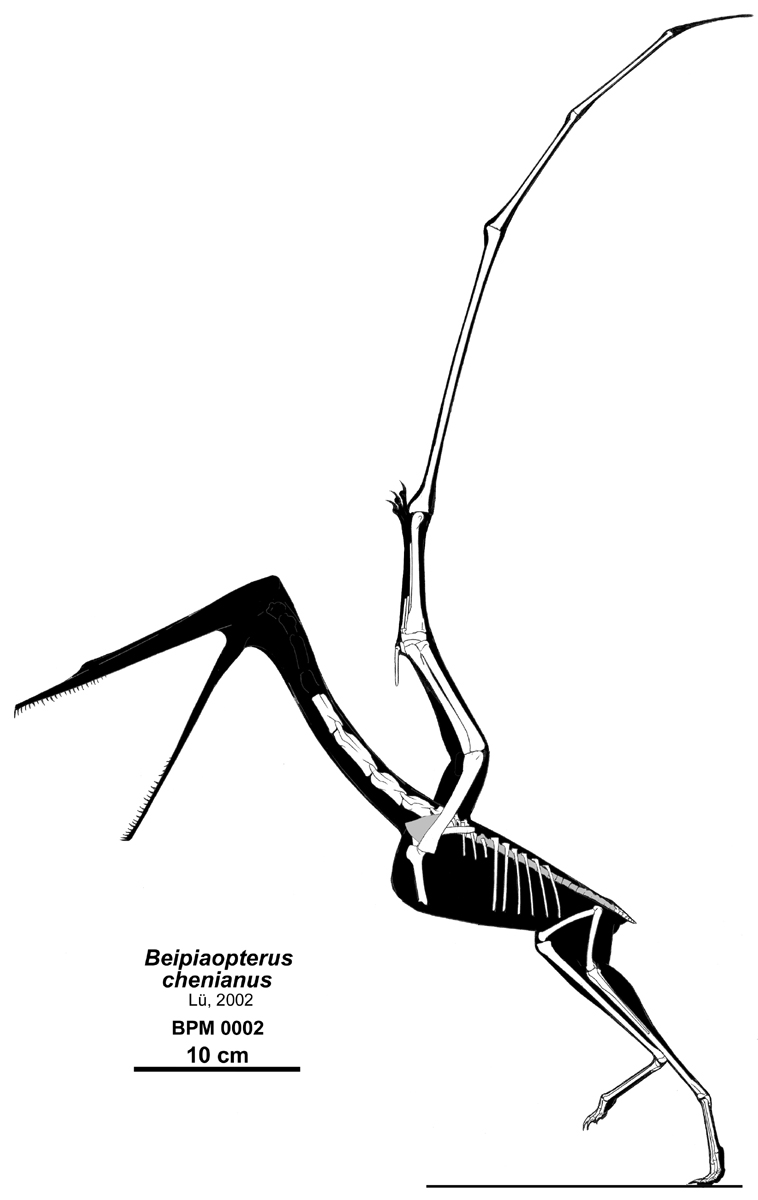
- Skeletal restoration by Jaime Headden

Scientific classification
- Kingdom: Animalia
- Phylum: Chordata
- Class: Reptilia
- Order: †Pterosauria
- Suborder: †Pterodactyloidea
- Family: †Ctenochasmatidae
- Tribe: †Pterodaustrini
- Genus: †Beipiaopterus; Lü, 2003

Type species
- †Beipiaopterus chenianus Lü, 2003

= Beipiaopterus =

Beipiaopterus Temporal range: Early Cretaceous, 124.6 Ma

Genus of ctenochasmatid pterosaur from the Early Cretaceous

Beipiaopterus is a genus of ctenochasmatid pterosaur from the Early Cretaceous period (Aptian stage) of what is now the Yixian Formation of the China.

The genus was named in 2003 by Lü Junchang. The generic name is derived from Beipiao City in Liaoning Province and a Latinized Greek pteron, "wing". The specific epithet honors paleontologist Professor Chen Peiji.

The type and only species is based on holotype BPM 0002, a crushed partial skeleton of a subadult individual on a slab, missing the skull. It includes four cervical, fourteen dorsal, three sacral and nine caudal vertebrae, a complete left wing and two hind limbs. Remains of the soft parts have been preserved, including partial wing membranes, a membrane attached to the tibia, a "mane" on the neck and webbing of the feet. It had a wingspan of 1 meter (3.3 ft), and the animal itself had a length of about 50 centimeters (1.6 ft), however, this is only if the skull had the same length as the remainder of the body: 103 millimeters (4.1 in) for the neck, ten centimetres for the rump and 37 millimeters (1.5 in) for the tail. In the wing finger the fourth, normally most extreme, phalanx was absent; according to Lü this was not an artifact of preservation but the normal condition of the animal, one also known from Nyctosaurus.

In 2005 a study of the wing membrane by SEM (scanning electron microscope) was published, showing it had contained many blood vessels, which indicated a role in the thermoregulation.

== Classification ==
Lü assigned Beipiaopterus to the Ctenochasmatidae because of the elongation of the cervical vertebrae and the general form of the humerus. This was later affirmed by an exact cladistic analysis which showed that it was a basal member of the group.

In 2018, Longrich, Martill and Andres recovered Beipiaopterus within the tribe Pterodaustrini, meaning that it was placed in a derived position within the Ctenochasmatidae, which contradicts its placement as a basal member.

- Ctenochasmatidae
  - Ctenochasmatinae
    - Ctenochasma
    - Pterodaustrini
      - Pterodaustro
      - - Beipiaopterus
        - Gegepterus
  - - Kepodactylus
    - - Moganopterinae
        - Moganopterus
        - Feilongus
      - - Ardeadactylus
        - - Elanodactylus
          - Gnathosaurinae
            - Huanhepterus
            - - Plataleorhynchus
              - Gnathosaurus

== See also ==
- List of pterosaur genera
- Timeline of pterosaur research

== Notes ==
- Lü J-C. and Wang X-L. 2001. "Soft tissue in an Early Cretaceous pterosaur from Liaoning Province, China". Journal of Vertebrate Paleontology 21 (supplement to 3): 74A.
- Lü J-C. 2002. "Soft tissue in an Early Cretaceous pterosaur from Liaoning Province, China". Memoir of the Fukui Prefectural Dinosaur Museum 1: 19– 28.
- Lü J.-C., 2003, "A new pterosaur: Beipiaopterus chenianus, gen. et sp. nov. (Reptilia: Pterosauria) from Western Liaoning Province, China". Memoir of the Fukui Prefectural Dinosaur Museum 2: 153–160.
- Lü J.-C., Kobayashi Y., Yuan C., Ji S., and Ji Q., 2005, "SEM Observation of the Wing Membrane of Beipiaopterus chenianus (Pterosauria)". Acta Geologica Sinica 79:6 766–769.
