= Gegepterus =

Gegepterus Temporal range: Early Cretaceous, 124.6 Ma

Scientific classification
- Kingdom: Animalia
- Phylum: Chordata
- Class: Reptilia
- Order: †Pterosauria
- Suborder: †Pterodactyloidea
- Family: †Ctenochasmatidae
- Tribe: †Pterodaustrini
- Genus: †Gegepterus; Wang et al., 2007

Type species
- †Gegepterus changi Wang et al., 2007

Synonyms
- G. changae

Genus of ctenochasmatid pterosaur from the Early Cretaceous

Gegepterus is a genus of ctenochasmatid pterosaur from the Early Cretaceous period of what is now the Yixian Formation of Liaoning, China. Only one species is known, G. changi.

== History and etymology ==
The genus was named in 2007 by Wang Xiaolin, Alexander Kellner, Zhou Zhonge and Diogenes de Almeida Campos. The type species is Gegepterus changi. The generic name is derived from Manchu ge ge, the title of a princess, in reference to the dainty gracility of the specimen, and a Latinized Greek pteron, "wing". The specific name honors female paleontologist Chang Meemann, who over the years established a cordial relationship between the Chinese and Brazilian authors. In 2008 Wang emended the epithet to changae, but such changes are no longer allowed by the ICZN.

It is known from two specimens. The first is holotype IVPP V 11981, which was in 2001 found in grey shales from the lower part of the Yixian Formation (estimated at 125 million years old), near the city of Beipiao. It consists of a crushed and damaged partial skeleton of a subadult including skull, lower jaws, cervical and sacral vertebrae, ribs, gastralia ("belly ribs"), shoulder girdle and hindlimb remains, along with dark soft tissue remains near the skull and gastralia and in the orbit; unfortunately, the soft tissue remains show no structure except for some small, unbranched fibers at the back of the head. The jaws are very elongated; the snout is flat and concave on top, with a low and thin crest. The forehead slightly projects to the front. The cervicals are elongated.

In 2011, a second, smaller specimen was described, IVPP V 11972, which increased the known skeletal elements and showed a more extensive covering of hair-like structures.

== Classification ==
The authors assigned Gegepterus to the Ctenochasmatidae, on the basis of its long rostrum and numerous needle-like teeth, about 150 in total. This is the first uncontroversial report of the Ctenochasmatidae from the Yixian Formation, as the fossils of other assumed ctenochasmatids have not preserved the dentition. It was at first suspected to be the juvenile of some known species.

Below is cladogram following a topology by Andres, Clark and Xu (2014). In the analysis, they recovered Gegepterus within the family Ctenochasmatidae, more precisely within the tribe Pterodaustrini, sister taxon to Beipiaopterus.

- Ctenochasmatidae
  - Ctenochasmatinae
    - Ctenochasma
    - Pterodaustrini
      - Pterodaustro guinazui
      - - Eosipterus yangi
        - - Beipiaopterus chenianus
          - Gegepterus changi
  - - Kepodactylus insperatus
    - - Elanodactylus prolatus
      - - Moganopterinae
          - Feilongus youngi
          - Moganopterus zhuiana
        - Gnathosaurinae
          - Huanhepterus quingyangensis
          - - Plataleorhynchus streptophorodon
            - - Gnathosaurus subulatus
              - Gnathosaurus macrurus

== See also ==
- List of pterosaur genera
- Timeline of pterosaur research
