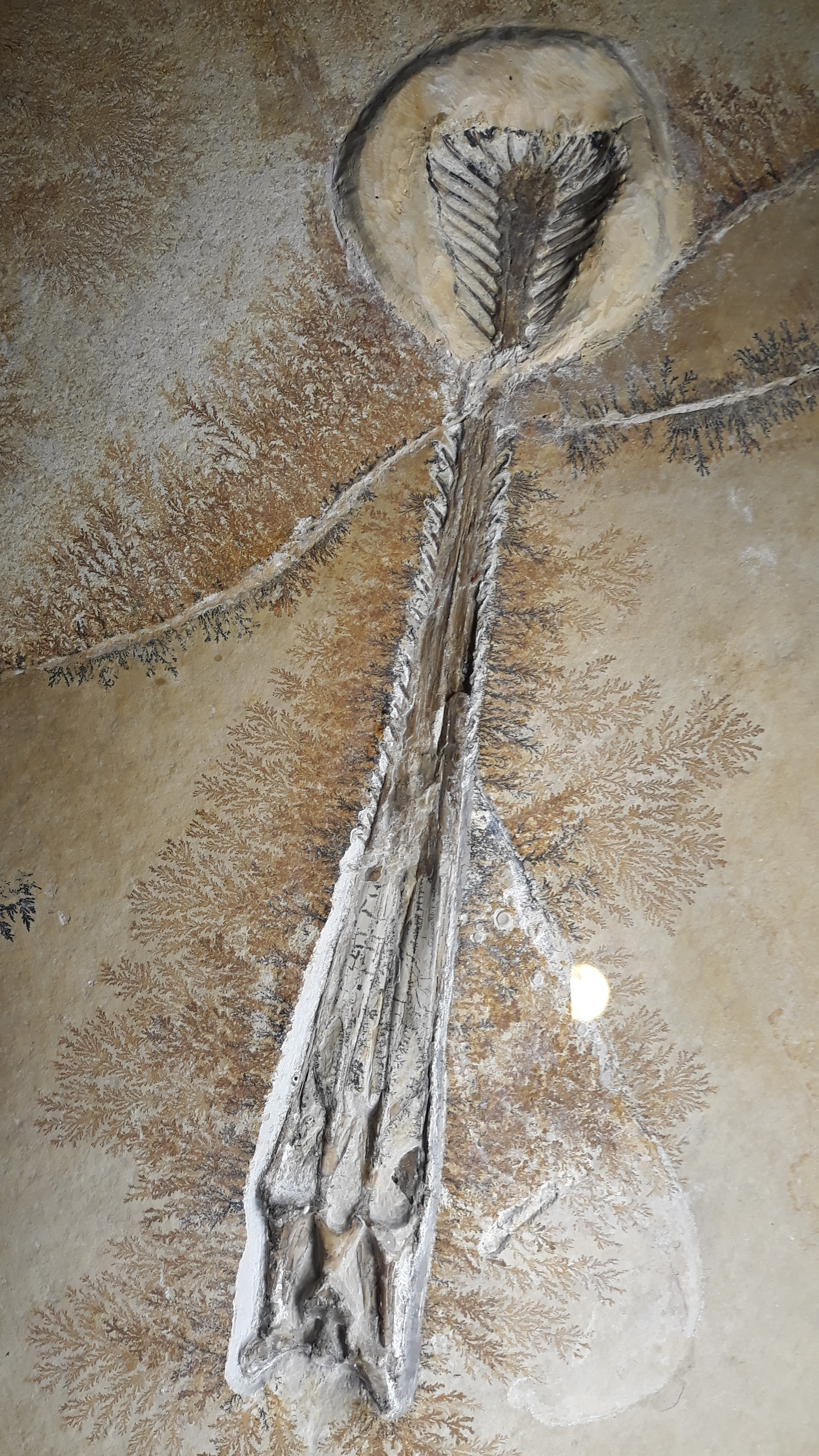
- Fossil skull referred to G. subulatus

Scientific classification
- Kingdom: Animalia
- Phylum: Chordata
- Class: Reptilia
- Order: †Pterosauria
- Suborder: †Pterodactyloidea
- Family: †Ctenochasmatidae
- Subfamily: †Gnathosaurinae
- Genus: †Gnathosaurus; Meyer, 1833

Type species
- †Gnathosaurus subulatus Meyer, 1833

Other species
- †G. macrurus (Seeley, 1869)

Synonyms
- Synonyms of G. macrurus: Pterodactylus macrurus Seeley, 1869; Synonyms of G. subulatus: Pterodactylus micronyx? Meyer, 1856; Aurorazhdarcho primordius? Frey et al., 2011

= Gnathosaurus =

Gnathosaurus Temporal range: Late Jurassic, Tithonian

Genus of ctenochasmatid pterosaur from the Late Jurassic period

Gnathosaurus (meaning "jawed lizard") is a genus of ctenochasmatid pterosaur containing two species: G. subulatus, named in 1833 from the Solnhofen Limestone of Germany, and G. macrurus, known from the Purbeck Limestone of the UK. Its fossil remains dated back to the Late Jurassic period.

== History of discovery ==
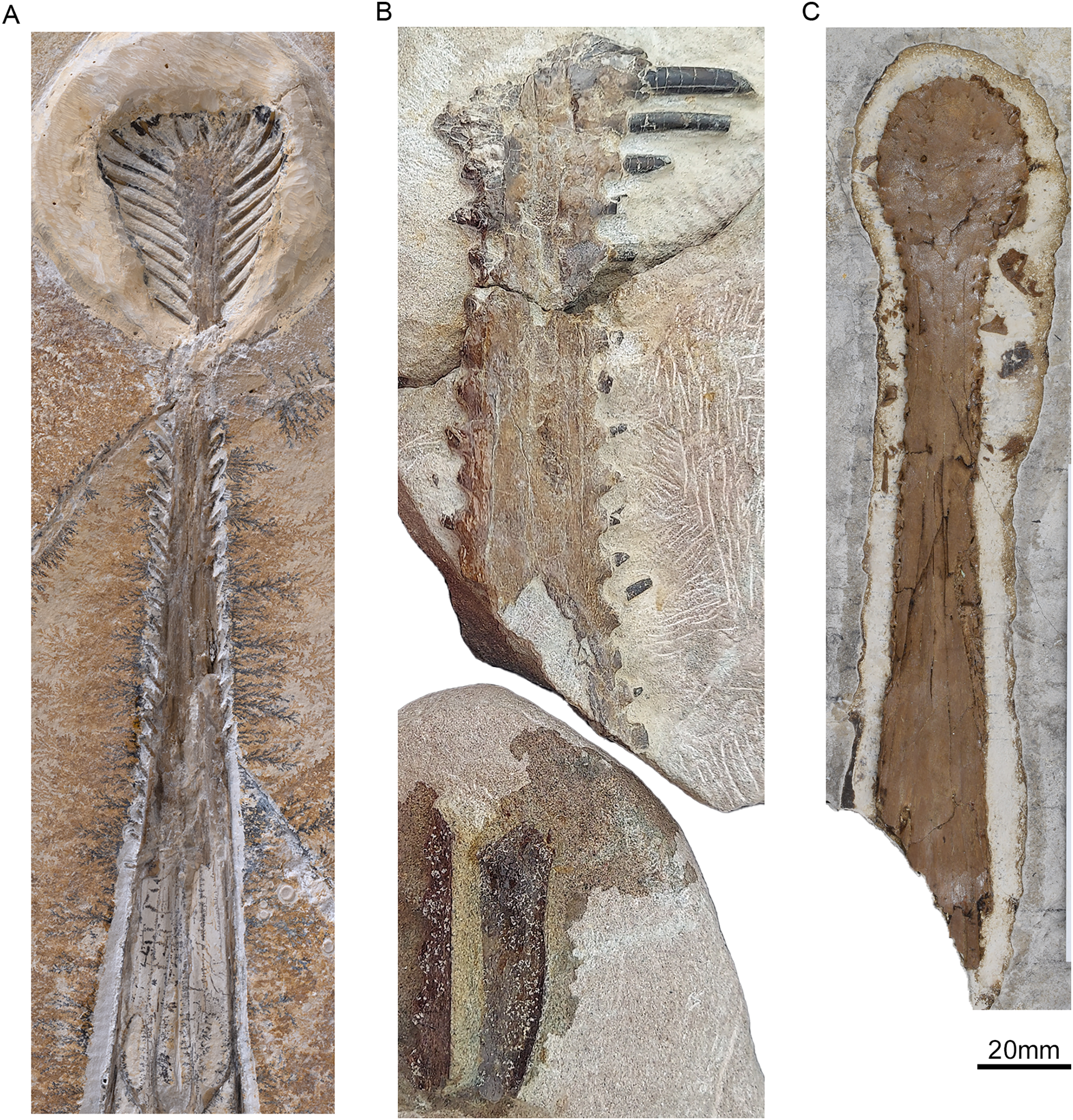
Comparison of gnathosaurine jaws; A is Gnathosaurus

Fragments of Gnathosaurus jaws were first discovered in 1832 in the Solnhofen limestones of southern Germany but were mistaken for a piece of teleosaurid crocodile jaw by Georg zu Münster, who first named the species Crocodilus multidens in that year. Soon afterwards, Hermann von Meyer classified the same specimen as the new genus and species Gnathosaurus subulatus, a name which came to be universally used shortly thereafter. In the 1860s, scientists such as Albert Oppel compared the G. subulatus jaw fragment to contemporary pterosaurs such as Pterodactylus and Ctenochasma, and concluded that it was also probably a "flying reptile" rather than a crocodilian. A more complete skull of an adult pterosaur was found in 1951 and classified as Gnathosaurus subulatus. This slender, 28 centimeters (11 in) long skull had up to 130 needle-like teeth arranged around the side of a spoon-shaped tip. The specimen had an estimated wingspan of about 1.7 meters (5.6 ft). It probably lead a lifestyle akin to that of modern spoonbills, wading with its jaws open and closing them upon touching small prey.

Possible juvenile specimens of G. subulatus may be known from several complete skeletons that had previously been classified as the separate species Pterodactylus micronyx. These specimens have also been referred to the genus Aurorazhdarcho, which may itself be a synonym of Gnathosaurus. Gnathosaurus subulatus is currently known only from skulls and jaws, and adult Aurorazhdarcho micronyx is known only from a skeleton lacking a skull, making direct comparisons difficult. Furthermore, in the only cladistic analysis to date that tests the relationships of both taxa they are found distinct. However, Bennett (2025) compared fossil material of Gnathosaurus subulatus with skulls of the largest juvenile specimens of Aurorazhdarcho micronyx, and concluded that Aurorazhdarcho micronyx is indeed a junior synonym of Gnathosaurus subulatus.

An additional large specimen, originally named Pterodactylus macrurus, is known from the Purbeck Limestone formation of England. Represented only by a partial lower jaw and neck vertebrae, it has since been considered closer to Gnathosaurus, and its binomial changed to G. macrurus.

== Classification ==
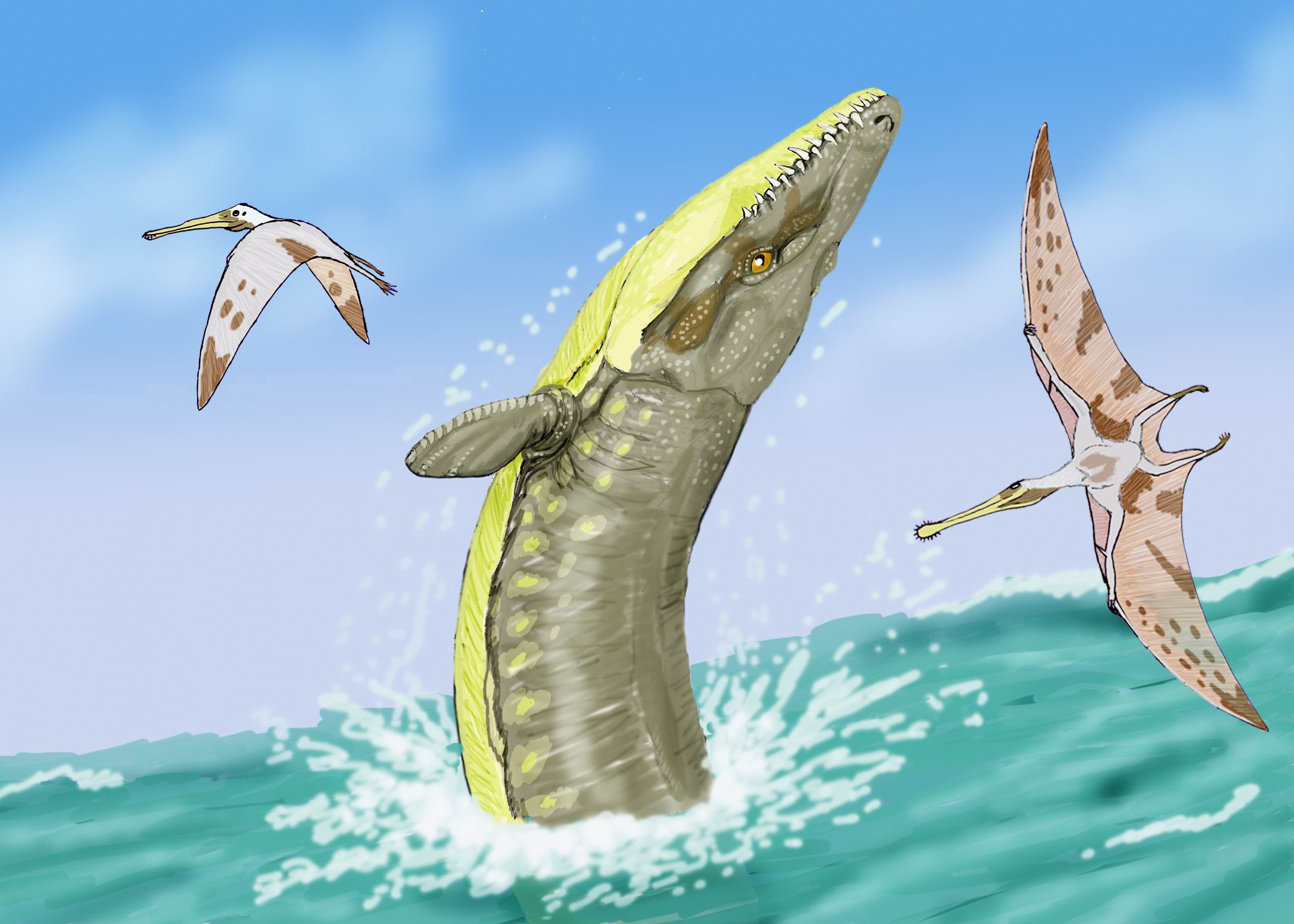
Reconstruction of two G. subulatus avoiding a Dakosaurus maximus

Below is cladogram following a topology by Sita Manitkoon and colleagues in a 2025 study; it finds Gnathosaurus to be most closely related to the genus Tacuadactylus.

- Ctenochasmatidae
  - - - Huanhepterus
      - - Aurorazhdarcho
        - Ardeadactylus
    - - - Elanodactylus
        - Forfexopterus
      - - Gladocephaloideus
        - - Feilongus
          - Moganopterus
  - - - Liaodactylus
      - - Pterofiltrus
        - Cathayopterus
    - - Gnathosaurinae
        - Plataleorhynchus
        - - - Lusognathus
            - Garudapterus
          - - Gnathosaurus
            - Tacuadactylus
      - - - Pterodaustro
          - - Gegepterus
            - Beipiaopterus
        - Ctenochasma

== See also ==
- List of pterosaur genera
- Timeline of pterosaur research
