= Elanodactylus =

Elanodactylus Temporal range: Early Cretaceous, 125.77–119.57 Ma

Scientific classification
- Kingdom: Animalia
- Phylum: Chordata
- Class: Reptilia
- Order: †Pterosauria
- Suborder: †Pterodactyloidea
- Family: †Ctenochasmatidae
- Genus: †Elanodactylus; Andres & Ji, 2008
- Species: †E. prolatus

Binomial name
- †Elanodactylus prolatus Andres & Ji, 2008

Genus of ctenochasmatid pterosaur from the Early Cretaceous

Elanodactylus (meaning "Kite finger") is a genus of ctenochasmatid pterodactyloid pterosaur from the Early Cretaceous period (early Aptian stage) of what is now the Yixian Formation of Liaoning, China.

== Discovery and naming ==
The genus was named in 2008 by Brian Andres and Ji Qiang. The type species is Elanodactylus prolatus. The generic name is derived from the Kite genus Elanus, in reference to the long wings, and Greek daktylos, "finger", referring to the wing finger of pterosaurs. The specific name means "elongated" in Latin, in reference to the elongated middle cervical vertebrae.

It is known from a partial postcranial skeleton, holotype NGMC 99-07-1, preserving the wings, sternum, shoulder girdle, ribs, cervical and dorsal vertebrae. It represents an adult individual. In 2010, a second adult was described, specimen LPM-R00078, also a skeleton lacking the skull.

== Description ==
The wingspan of the holotype was about 2.5 m (8.2 ft), and it is estimated to have weighed 10 kg (22 lb).

The first phalanx of the wing finger is shorter than both the second and third phalanges, an autapomorphy.

The neck vertebrae possess exapophyses, a similarity with those of azhdarchids, long-necked giant pterosaurs most common in the Late Cretaceous. However, other skeletal material from Elanodactylus is otherwise distinct from the skeletons of azhdarchids. Andres and Ji performed a phylogenetic analysis and found that Elanodactylus was a ctenochasmatid. They postulated that ctenochasmatids and azhdarchids convergently evolved similar neck vertebrae.

== Classification ==
Below is a cladogram following a phylogenetic analysis published by paleontologists Longrich, Martill, and Andres in 2018. They recovered Elanodactylus within the family Ctenochasmatidae.

- Ctenochasmatidae
  - Ctenochasmatinae
    - Ctenochasma
    - Pterodaustrini
      - Pterodaustro
      - - Beipiaopterus
        - Gegepterus
  - - Kepodactylus
    - - Moganopterinae
        - Moganopterus
        - Feilongus
      - - Ardeadactylus
        - - Elanodactylus
          - Gnathosaurinae
            - Huanhepterus
            - - Plataleorhynchus
              - Gnathosaurus

== See also ==
- List of pterosaur genera
- Timeline of pterosaur research
- Pterosaur size
