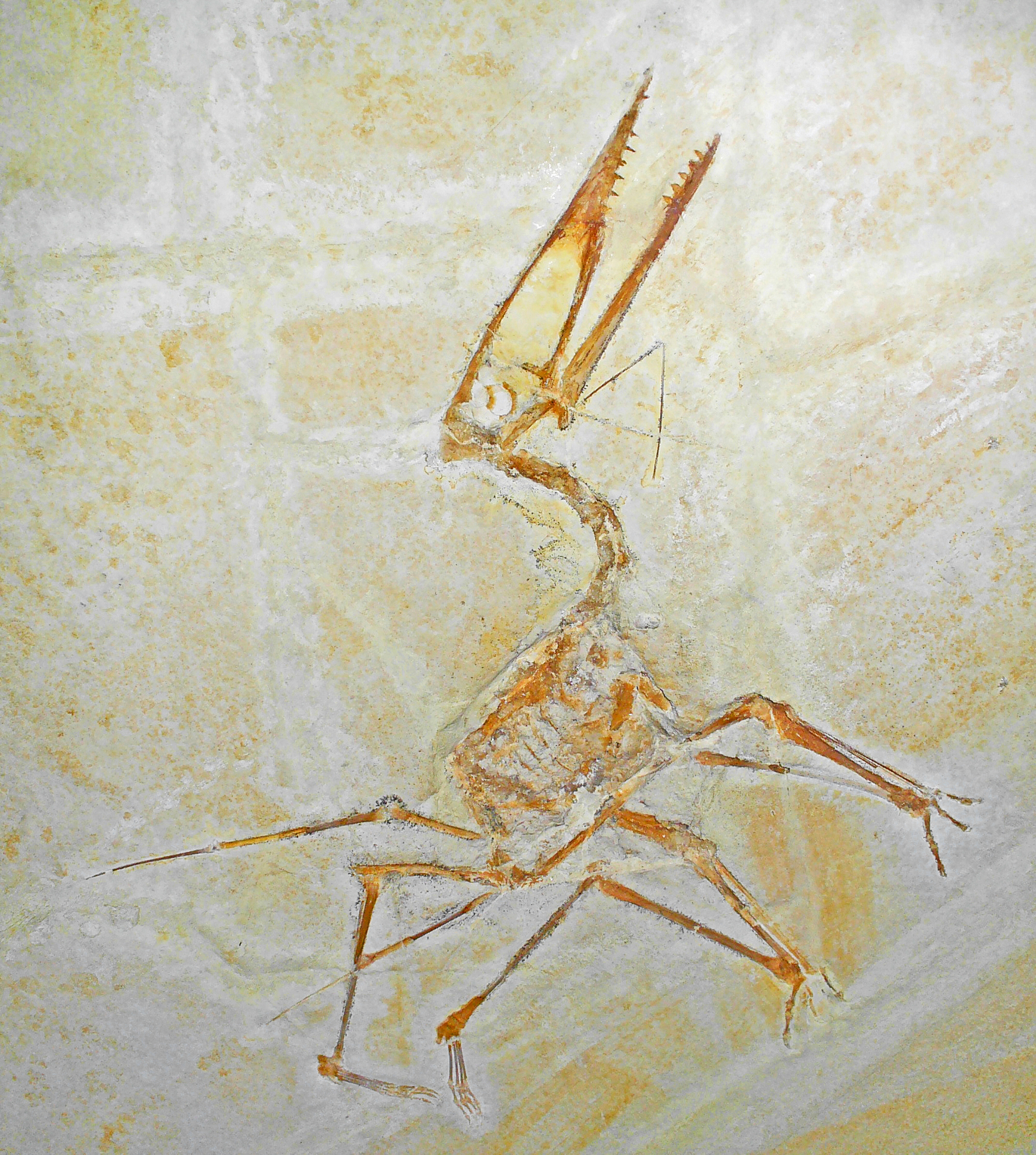
- Fossil specimen of Germanodactylus cristatus

Scientific classification
- Kingdom: Animalia
- Phylum: Chordata
- Class: Reptilia
- Order: †Pterosauria
- Suborder: †Pterodactyloidea
- Infraorder: †Archaeopterodactyloidea
- Family: †Germanodactylidae; Yang, 1964

Type species
- †Pterodactylus cristatus Wiman, 1925

Subgroups
- †Altmuehlopterus?; †Germanodactylus; †Tendaguripterus?

= Germanodactylidae =

Germanodactylids Temporal range: Late Jurassic possible Late Cretaceous reccord in foot tracks

Family of pterodactyloid pterosaurs

Germanodactylidae is a controversial group of pterosaurs within the suborder Pterodactyloidea. It was first named by Yang Zhongjian in 1964, and given a formal phylogenetic definition in 2014 by Brian Andres, James Clark, and Xu Xing. They defined it as the least inclusive clade containing Germanodactylus cristatus and Normannognathus wellnhoferi, which they considered to be close relatives at the time. However, more recent studies by the same researchers have found that these pterosaurs may be only distantly related.

Studies performed in the 2000s suggested this group it contained three genera: Germanodactylus, Normannognathus and Tendaguripterus. Various studies have since placed these pterosaurs within the larger clades Archaeopterodactyloidea, Eupterodactyloidea, or Dsungaripteroidea, though it has also been recovered within the Ctenochasmatoidea. In several 2010s studies, the supposed "germanodactylid" species were not necessarily found to form a natural group with each other, and even the genus Germanodactylus itself was discovered to be likely paraphyletic, causing one of its component species to be renamed Altmuehlopterus. This would render the name Germanodactylidae synonymous with some other clade, such as Eupterodactyloidea or Lophocratia.

== Classification ==
Below is a cladogram showing the results of a phylogenetic analysis presented by Longrich, Martill, and Andres, 2018.

- Archaeopterodactyloidea
  - Germanodactylidae
    - Germanodactylus cristatus
    - Germanodactylus rhamphastinus
  - Euctenochasmatia
    - Pterodactylus antiquus
    - Ctenochasmatoidea
      - Gallodactylidae
        - Cycnorhamphus suevicus
        - Normannognathus wellnhoferi
      - Ctenochasmatidae
