= Tendaguripterus =

Tendaguripterus Temporal range: Late Kimmeridgian to Early Tithonian, Late Jurassic 151–148 Ma

Scientific classification
- Kingdom: Animalia
- Phylum: Chordata
- Class: Reptilia
- Order: †Pterosauria
- Suborder: †Pterodactyloidea
- Family: †Tendaguripteridae; Kellner, 2007
- Genus: †Tendaguripterus; Unwin & Heinrich, 1999
- Species: †T. recki

Binomial name
- †Tendaguripterus recki Unwin & Heinrich, 1999

Extinct genus of reptiles

Tendaguripterus ('Tendaguru wing') is a genus of pterosaur that lived during the Late Jurassic period in what is now Tanzania. The only specimen – a dentary (lower jaw) – was discovered in strata of the Tendaguru Formation in southeastern Lindi. Between 1910 and 1912, members of a German fossil expedition to the Tendaguru Formation in then-German East Africa collected many pterosaur fossils from Site Jg. One fossil, an isolated dentary, was later taken to the Museum für Naturkunde in Berlin, Germany. This specimen was unnoticed for decades until in 1999, paleontologists David Unwin and Wolf-Dieter Heinrich scientifically described it as belonging to a new genus and species of pterosaur. They named it Tendaguripterus recki, the only known species, after German geologist Hans Reck.

Tendaguripterus' affinities are uncertain. In its original description, it was considered an intermediate stage of dsungaripteroid that was more derived than Germanodactylus but less derived than dsungaripterids like Dsungaripterus and Noripterus. However, in 2007 Brazilian paleontologist Alexander Kellner and colleagues placed it in its own family, Tendaguripteridae. The classification of this family within Pterodactyloidea is unknown. Based on Germanodactylus, its wingspan was about 1 meter (3.3 ft) wide. The dentary is short, robust, and tall, with four alveoli (tooth sockets) and two incomplete teeth preserved. Going posteriorly (towards the back), the dentary becomes over 1.5 times the height of the anterior (front) end, creating an extremely deep shape. Its toothrow looks scalloped (bumpy around the alveoli) in lateral view with intensely protruding teeth. It has been proposed that Tendaguripterus was durophagus, feeding on hard invertebrates like bivalves. Its fossils are known from the Tendaguru Formation, which was located on the southeastern coast of the landmass Gondwana during the Late Jurassic. Here it coexisted with other pterosaurs like "Rhamphorhynchus" tendagurensis and "Pterodactylus" brancai and dinosaurs like Giraffatitan and Kentrosaurus.

== Discovery and naming ==
Fossils of African pterosaurs are extremely rare, only being known from a few geologic formations. From 1909 to 1913, German paleontological expeditions to outcrops of the Tendaguru Formation in southeastern Lindi, German East Africa (now Tanzania) unearthed the first pterosaur fossils from East Africa known to science. During these excursions, fragmentary, isolated pterosaur material was unearthed that was initially described in 1914 by German paleontologist Werner Janensch. The first major work on Tendaguru pterosaurs was published in 1931 by German geologist Hans Reck, who assigned many of these bones to new species of Pterodactylus and Rhamphorhynchus. Most of this material consisted of incomplete wing and hindlimb bones, few of which are well preserved enough to be definitively classified. All of the species named by Reck are now considered nomen dubia.

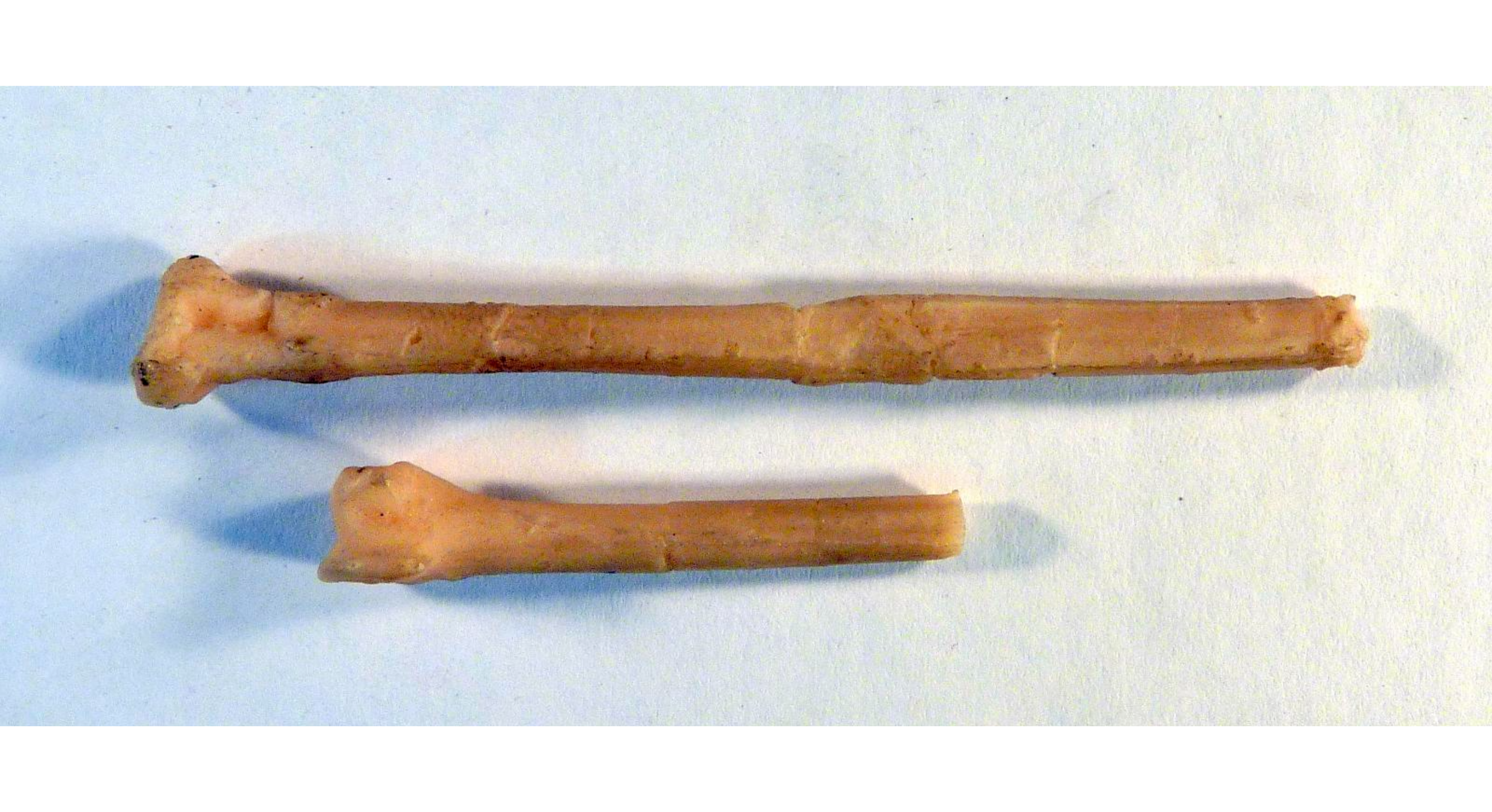
Cast of the tibiotarsus and wing phalanx of "Pterodactylus" brancai, which has been proposed to belong to Tendaguripterus

From 1910 to 1912, Reck directed members of the expedition to focus on collecting remains from Site Jg of Tendaguru Hill, a site in the northern reaches of the area. Site Jg belongs to the Middle Saurian Bed of the Tendaguru Formation, which dates to the Late Kimmeridgian to Early Tithonian stages of the Late Jurassic period. At one point, most likely during 1912, expedition collectors discovered an incomplete mandibular symphysis (the area where lower jaws meet) of a pterosaur. Sometime after, the fossil was deposited at the Museum für Naturkunde of the Humboldt University, Berlin under specimen number MB.R.1290. However, this fossil was unprepared for decades and was not identified as from a pterosaur fossil until 1986. It stayed in-situ for decades, but was later prepared with the use of acetic acid by German museum worker H. H. Kreuger. In 1999, German paleontologists David M. Unwin and Wolf-Dieter Heinrich scientifically described MB.R.1290 as coming from a new genus and species of dsungaripteroid pterosaur, Tendaguripterus recki. The generic name comes from "Tendaguru", where the fossil was collected, and the Greek word ptero meaning "wing". Meanwhile, the specific name recki is in honor of Hans Reck. MB.R.1290 was selected as the holotype (name-bearing) specimen and remains the only fossil reported of Tendaguripterus. This was the first documentation of pterosaur skull material from Tendaguru.

In a 2008 article, German paleontologists Oliver Rauhut and Adriana Lopez-Arbarello proposed that fossils of Pterodactylus brancai, consisting of a of tibiotarsus (lower leg bone) and wing phalanx one (finger bone), came from the same organism as Tendaguripterus. Reck described P. brancai based on the two elements, though whether they came from the same individual is unknown. Later studies have declared P. brancai a nomen dubium. In 1980, German researcher Peter Galton moved P. brancai to the genus Dsungaripterus, but later studies have opposed this, stating that P. brancai dubious and an indeterminate dsungaripteroid. Based on the purported dsungaripteroid affinities of Tendaguripterus, Rauhut and Lopez-Arbarello (2008) noted that although they may derive from the same species, the lack of overlap between specimens makes this difficult to verify.

== Description and classification ==
Overall, dsungaripteroids have stocky builds, with robustly constructed skull and limb bones in comparison to other pterosaur groups. In 1999, Unwin and Heinrich stated the skull of Tendaguripterus was around 20 centimetres (7.9 in) when complete based on Germanodactylus, with an estimated wingspan width of 1 meter (3.3 ft). MB.R.1290 has a preserved length of 25.9 centimetres (10.2 in) and is dorsoventrally (top-bottom) deepest towards the posterior (back) end, at 9.9 centimetres (3.9 in) deep. It is preserved in three dimensions, but underwent some taphonomic compression. Each mandible fragment bears four alveoli (tooth sockets), with only two, incomplete teeth preserved. When complete, each dentary had at least five aveoli. The symphysis narrows towards the anterior (front) end, with a deep triangular cross-section. Going posteriorly, the symphysis becomes significantly deeper, with the deepest point of the mandible being 1.5 times the height of the anterior jaw tip. This is similar to the condition found in Dsungaripterus and Germanodactylus, two dsungaripteroids. In contrast, pteranodontoids like Tropeognathus bear jaws that are deeper anteriorly rather than posteriorly. A characteristic diagnostic (distinguishing from related genera) of Tendaguripterus is a concave section on the ventral (bottom) face of the posterior end of the jaw. Although related dsungaripteroids have a similar condition, it is most extreme in Tendaguripterus. When viewed in lateral (side) view, the dental margin (toothrow) appears scalloped, with strongly protruding teeth. This causes the rims of the alveoli to seem inflated, more so than in Germanodactylus and less so than in Dsungaripterus. Unlike any other dsungaripteroids, Tendaguripterus' teeth project posteriorly instead of vertically or anteriorly. Its teeth are robust, in contrast to the elongated, thin dentition of ctenochasmatids.

=== Classification ===
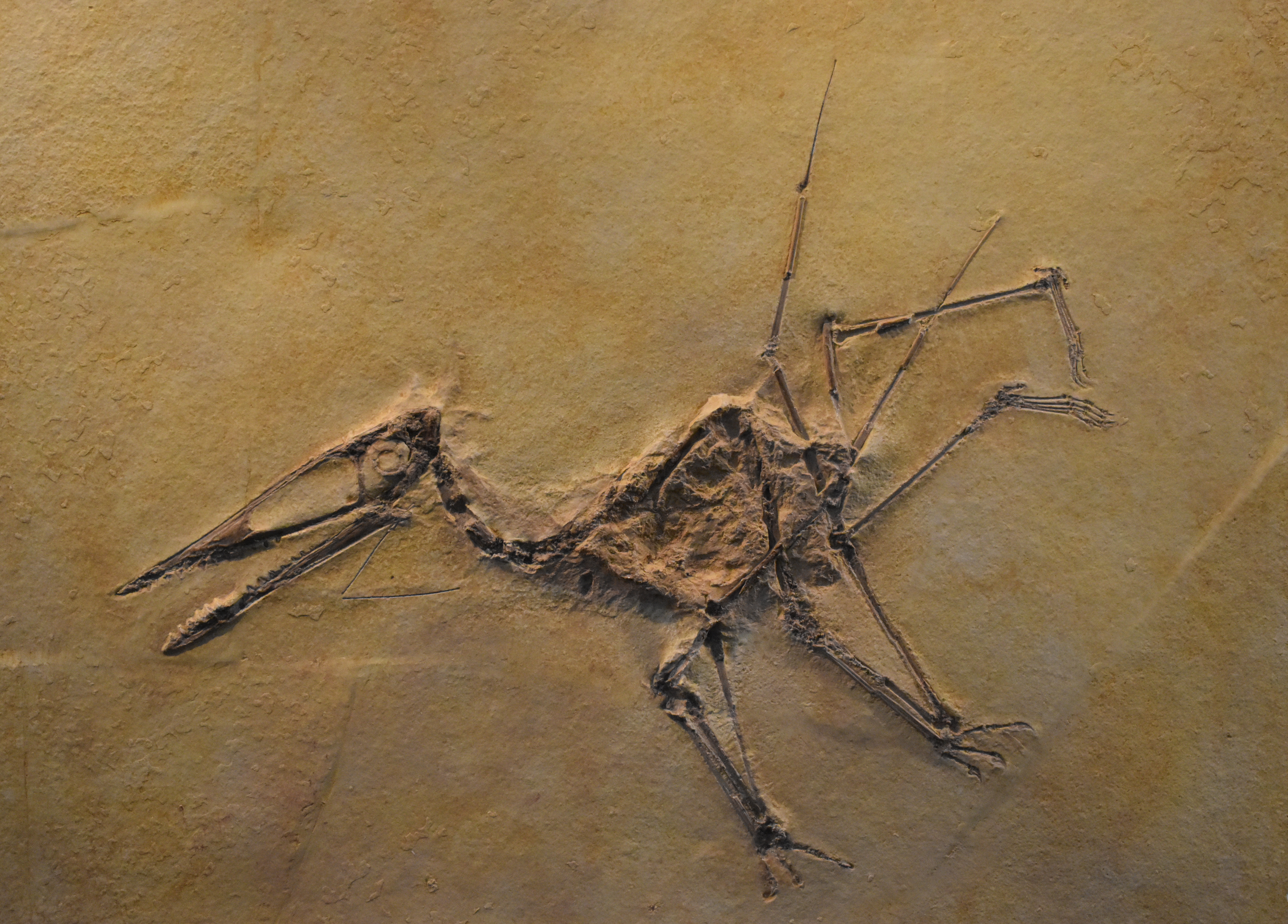
A skeleton of Germanodactylus, a possible relative

In 1999, Unwin and Heinrich grouped Tendaguripterus in Dsungaripteroidea due to traits such as its deep lower jaw and its largest teeth being at the posterior end of its tooth row. In 2003, Unwin included it in Dsungaripteroidea as well, but did not place it in Dsungaripteridae itself. However, in a 2007 study Brazilian paleontologist Alexander Kellner and colleagues stated that its resemblance to Germanodactylus and Dsungaripterus was superficial. The authors added by noting Tendaguripterus cannot even definitively be considered a pterodactyloid and that it lacked any synapomorphies of Dsungaripteroidea. As a result, they named a new family, Tendaguripteridae, exclusively for the genus. Since its description, Tendaguripterus has not been included in a phylogenetic analysis. Its affinities remain unclear.

== Paleoecology ==
Tendaguripterus may have consumed bivalves and other hard-shelled invertebrates. Due to this, it is likely to have inhabited the coasts of a shallow sea or riverbanks. The Tendaguru Formation contains dsungaripteroids, rhamphorynchoids, and basal pterodactyloids. This taxonomic composition is similar to that of the Tatal, Mongolia (Tsagan-Tsab Formation) and Xinjiang, China (Lianmuqin Formation) pterosaur assemblages from the Early Cretaceous of Asia.

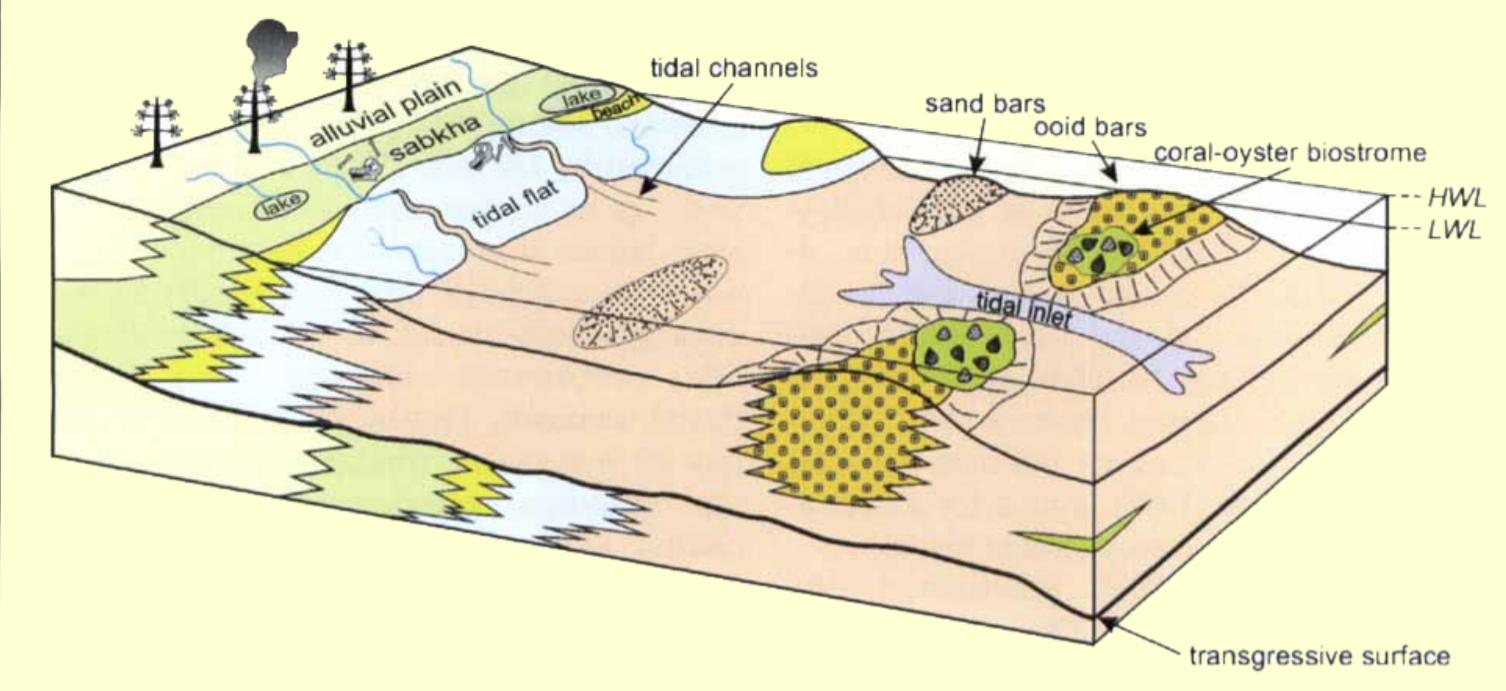
Generalized diagram of the Tendaguru Formation depositional environment

The Tendaguru Formation is a Late Jurassic-aged geologic formation in the Mandawa Basin in southeastern Tanzania. It is composed of six members, though Tendaguripterus is exclusive to the late Kimmeridgian-aged Middle Saurian Member. This section of the formation is defined by fine calcareous sandstones, siltstones, and crudely bedded silt and claystones. In the Late Jurassic, the landmass of Gondwana had not splintered into what is now Africa, South America, India, and Madagascar. The Tendaguru Formation is deposited in what was then the southeastern coast of the landmass, which featured a coastal semi-arid climate with a relatively high moisture content compared to the inland. The Tendaguru ecosystem primarily consisted of three types of environment: shallow, lagoon-like marine environments, tidal flats and low coastal environments; and vegetated inland environments. Its marine environment existed above the fair weather wave base and behind siliciclastic and ooid barriers. It appeared to have had little change in salinity levels and experienced tides and storms. The coastal environments consisted of brackish coastal lakes, ponds and pools. Unlike other layers of the formation, the Middle Dinosaur Member had an especially dry landscape with few marine waters and plentiful brackish and freshwater locales. This member was deposited in a series of tidal flats, lagoons, and coastal sabkhas.

The Tendaguru Formation is among the most productive dinosaur-bearing fossil sites in Africa. Dinosaurs known from the Tendaguru Formation include the predatory theropods Torvosaurus, Elaphrosaurus, Veterupristisaurus, and Ostafrikasaurus, as well as the herbivorous ornithischians Dysalotosaurus and Kentrosaurus. Sauropods are the most common dinosaurs in the formation, represented by genera like Dicraeosaurus, Giraffatitan, Janenschia, Tendaguria, and Tornieria. Other vertebrates that shared this paleoenvironment included mammals, lizards, frogs, crocodyliforms, bony fish, rays, and sharks. Marine invertebrates are common, represented by corals, bivalves, gastropods, and ostracods. The flora included green algae, Araucariacites and Classopollis conifers, Ginkgoxylon ginkgoes, and more.

== See also ==
- List of pterosaur genera
- Timeline of pterosaur research
