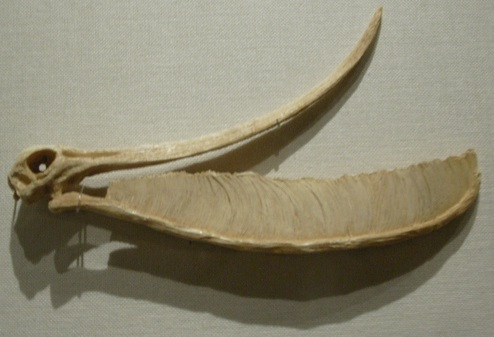
- Restored skull of the ctenochasmatid Pterodaustro guinazui
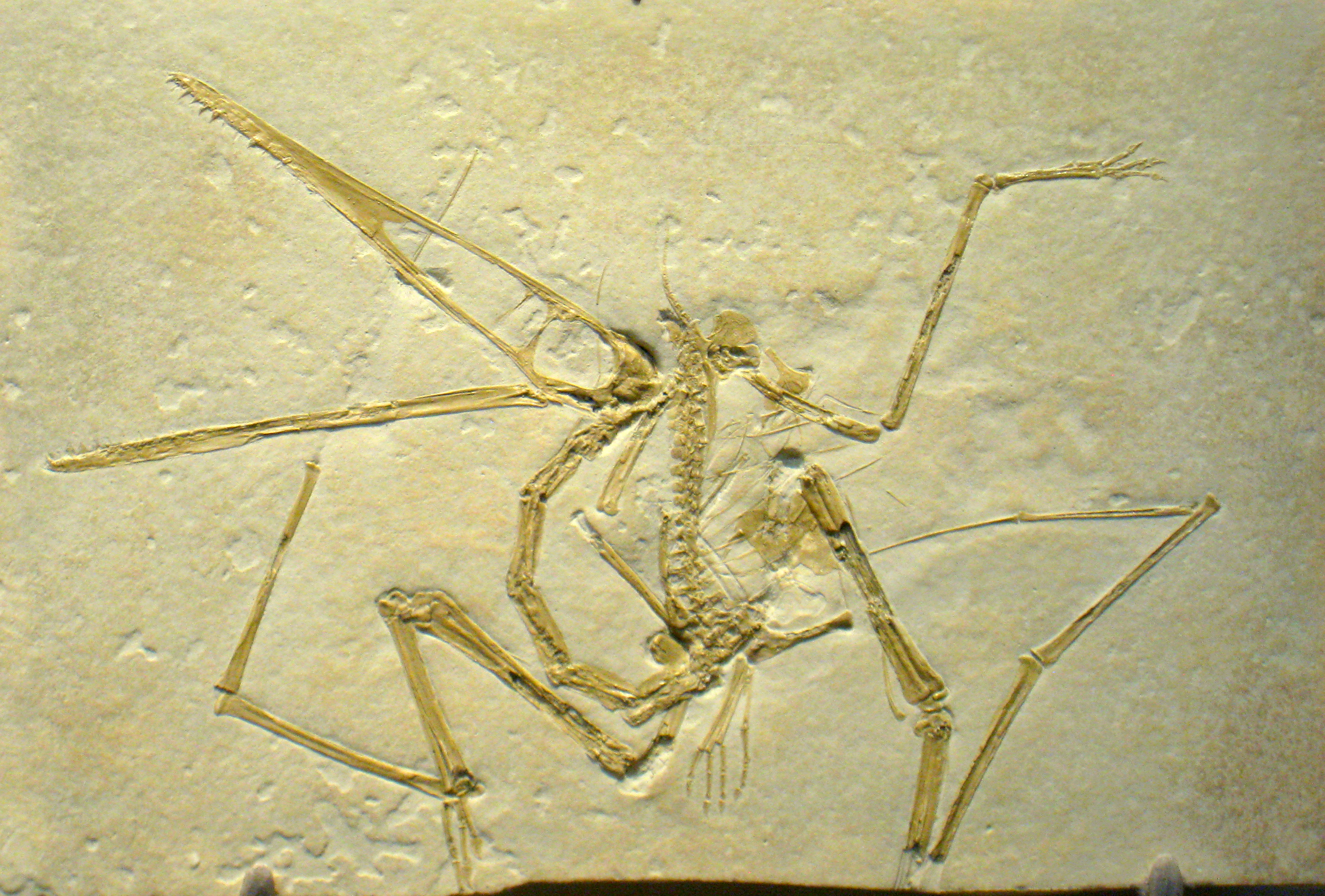
- Cast of the sub-adult type specimen of Pterodactylus antiquus, an archaeopterodactyloid.

Scientific classification
- Kingdom: Animalia
- Phylum: Chordata
- Class: Reptilia
- Order: †Pterosauria
- Suborder: †Pterodactyloidea
- Infraorder: †Archaeopterodactyloidea; Kellner, 1996

Subgroups
- †Prejanopterus?; †Germanodactylidae?; †Euctenochasmatia Unwin, 2003; †Diopecephalus?; †Pterodactylus; †Ctenochasmatoidea Nopcsa, 1928; †Ardeadactylus; †Aurorazhdarcho; †Petrodactyle; †Ctenochasmatidae; †Gallodactylidae

= Archaeopterodactyloidea =

Archaeopterodactyloids Temporal range: Late Jurassic – Early Cretaceous, 152–105 Ma

Infraorder of pterodactyloid pterosaurs

Archaeopterodactyloidea (meaning "ancient Pterodactyloidea") is an extinct clade of pterodactyloid pterosaurs that lived from the middle Late Jurassic to the latest Early Cretaceous periods (Kimmeridgian to Albian stages) of Africa, Asia, Europe and North America. It was named by Alexander Wilhelm Armin Kellner in 1996 as the group that contains Germanodactylus, Pterodactylus, the Ctenochasmatidae and the Gallodactylidae. Some researchers dispute the relationship of Germanodactylus to other members of the group, and instead use the terms Euctenochasmatia or Ctenochasmatoidea to describe the lineage of Pterodactylus, gallodactylids, and ctenochasmatids.

The earliest known archaeopterodactyloid remains date to the Late Jurassic Kimmeridgian age. Previously, a fossil jaw recovered from the Middle Jurassic Stonesfield Slate formation in the United Kingdom, was considered the oldest known. This specimen supposedly represented a member of the family Ctenochasmatidae, though further examination suggested it belonged to a teleosaurid crocodylomorph instead of a pterosaur.

== Anatomy ==
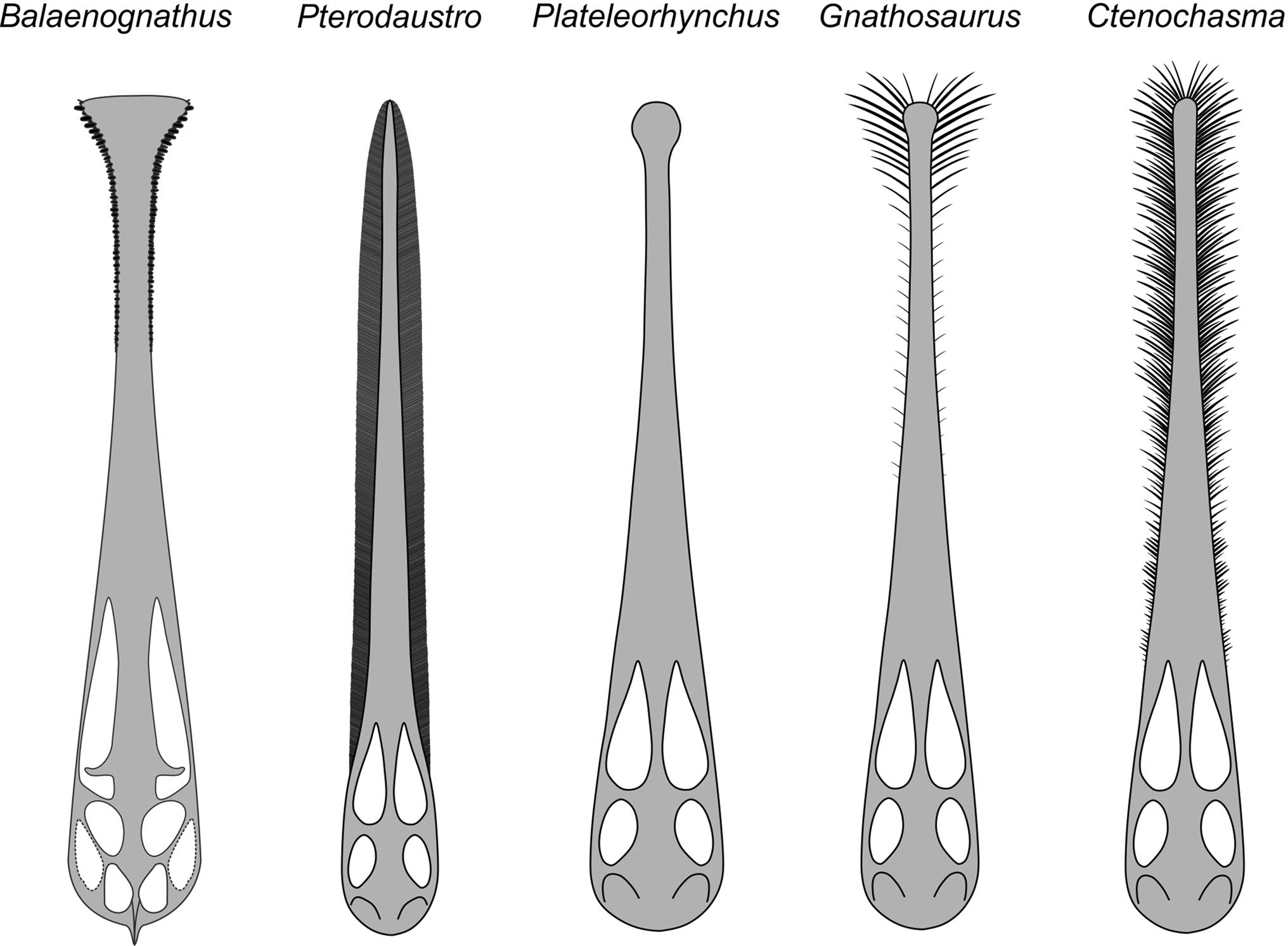
Distinctive skulls of several ctenochasmatoids

Many archaeopterodactyloids had very distinctive features in comparison to other pterosaurs, including the shape of their jaws, as well as their highly specialized teeth. These teeth are thought to have been used for filter-feeding, the genus Pterodaustro for example, had a long snout and its lower jaws curve strongly upwards, and the tangent at the point of the snout was perpendicular to that of the jaw joint. Pterodaustro has around a thousand baleen-like teeth in its lower jaws that might have been used to strain crustaceans, plankton, algae, and other small creatures from the water. The teeth of Pterodaustro are unique within pterosaurs, and no other discovered genera had this type of teeth.

A peculiar family within this group is the Ctenochasmatidae, which most of the members had very distinguishing teeth that were lined within their elongated snouts. A genus called Pterofiltrus only had 112 teeth, but these teeth cover about 55.8% of the total skull, and the skull itself measured about 208 millimeters (8.2 in) in length.

Other members of this group, such as the gallodactylids, differ from other euctenochasmatians in several distinct features, including having fewer than 50 teeth, and were only present in the jaw tips; rounded crests were also present on the rear portion of the skull and jaws but not near the ends of their snouts. Similarly, the ctenochasmatid Feilongus also had its teeth confined within its jaw tips, as well as having crests on the rear portion of the skull and jaws, but differed Feilongus from the gallodactylids by having a possible pronounced overbite, and 76 teeth, which were needle-like.

One of the largest toothed pterosaurs was Moganopterus, it was, yet again, a ctenochasmatid, and was similar in build to Feilongus. What made Moganopterus distinct was its size; while Feilongus had a wingspan of about 2.4 meters (7.9 ft), Moganopterus had an impressive wingspan of more than 7 meters (23 ft), making it more than three times larger than Feilongus.

== Behavior and ecology ==
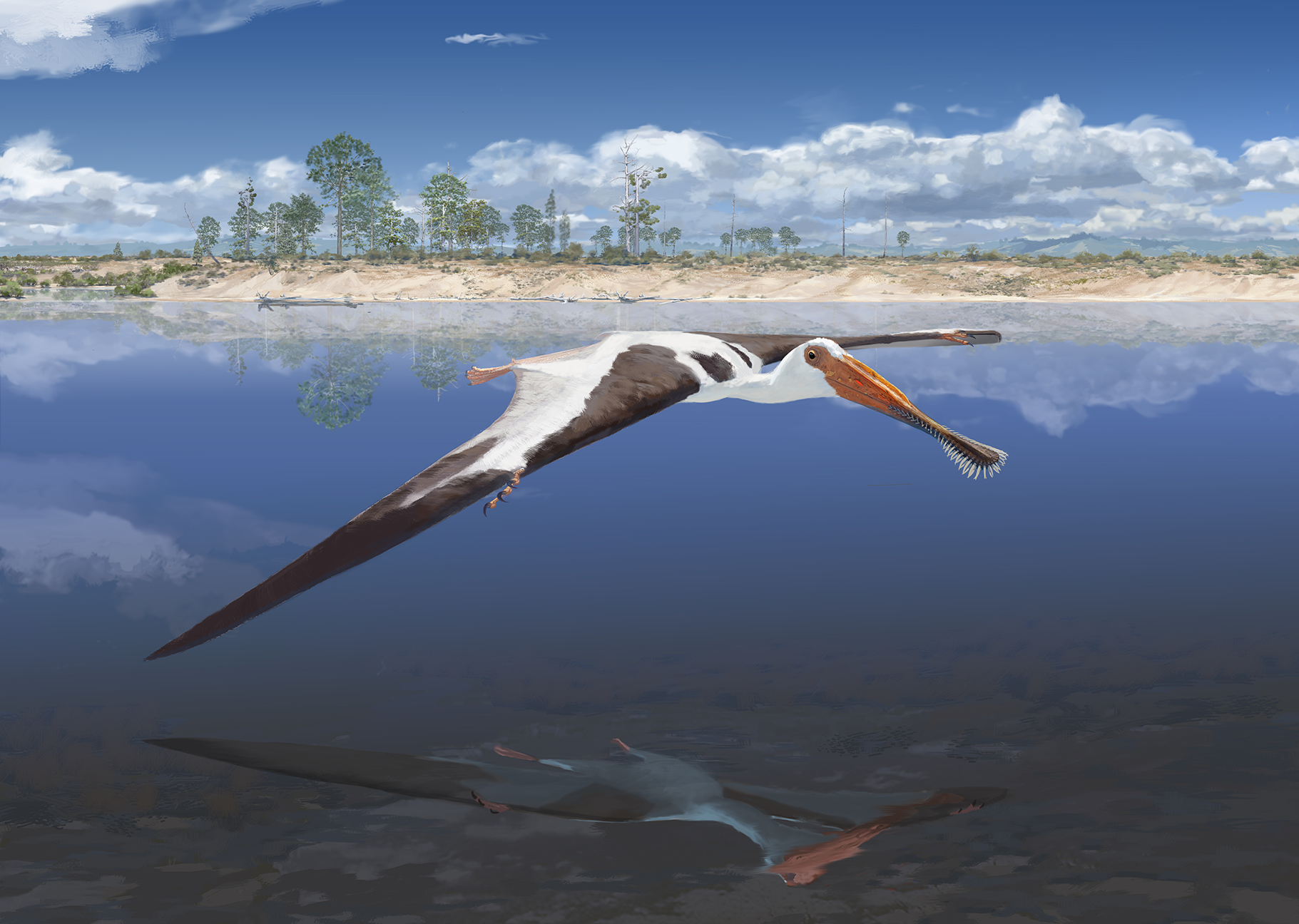
Life reconstruction of ctenochasmatid Lusognathus

Most archaeopterodactyloids have wing proportions akin to those of modern shorebirds and ducks, and probably possessed a similar frantic, powerful flight style. The exception is Ctenochasma, which appears to have had longer wings and was probably more comparable to modern skuas.

Launching varied radically among members of this clade. In forms like Cycnorhamphus, long limbs and shorter torsos meant a level of relative ease. In forms like Pterodaustro, however, which possessed long torsos and short limbs, launching might have been a more taxing and prolonged affair, only possible in large open areas, just like modern heavy-bodied aquatic birds such as swans, even with the pterosaurian quadrupedal launching.

Many archaeopterodactyloids were aquatic or semi-aquatic pterosaurs; their remains are usually found in what were once coastal or lake environments. Some of them possessed large webbed hindfeet and long torsos, which were both adaptations for swimming and floating. The exception to their occurrence in coastal settings are the gallodactylids, which generally possessed more slender limbs and shorter torsos. They occupied a wide variety of ecological niches, from generalistic carnivores like Pterodactylus to filter-feeders like Pterodaustro and possible molluscivores like Cycnorhamphus. Most common, however, were straight-jawed, needle-toothed forms, some of the most notable being Ctenochasma and Gnathosaurus; these possibly occupied an ecological niche akin to that of modern spoonbills, their teeth forming spatula-like jaw profile extensions, allowing them a larger surface area to catch individual small prey.

== Classification ==
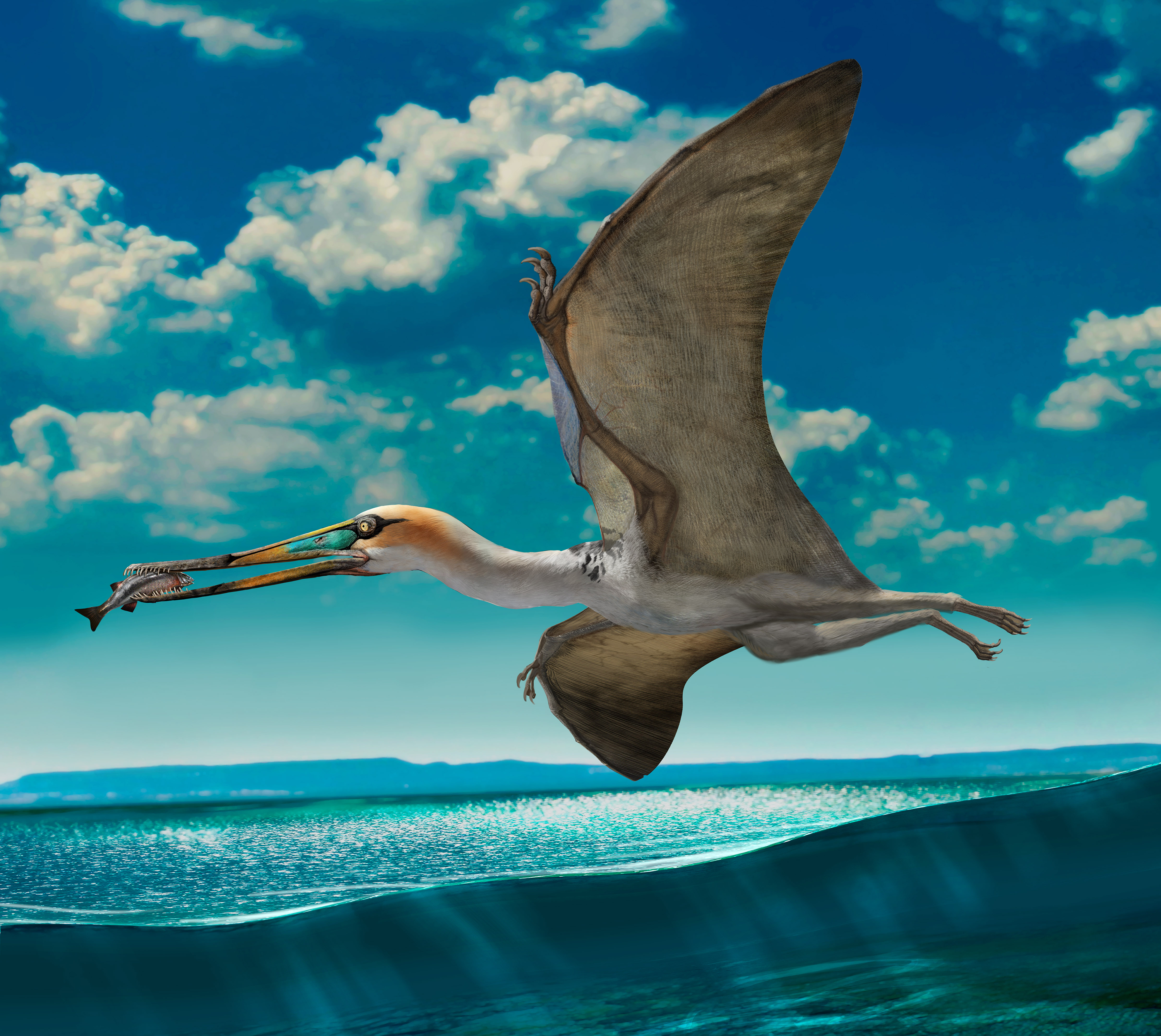
Life reconstruction of the ctenochasmatid Gladocephaloideus in a coastal environment

In 2003, Kellner defined Archaeopterodactyloidea as a node-based taxon consisting of the last common ancestor of Pterodactylus, Ctenochasma and Gallodactylus and all its descendants. Although phylogenetic analyses that based on David Unwin's 2003 analysis do not recover monophyletic Archaeopterodactyloidea, phylogenetic analyses that based on Kellner's analyses, or the analyses of Brian Andres (2008, 2010, 2018) recover monophyletic Archaeopterodactyloidea at the base of the Pterodactyloidea.

The largest subgroup of archaeopterodactyloids is the group Euctenochasmatia. This group was named by David Unwin in 2003 as the group that contains the most recent common ancestor of Pterodactylus and Ctenochasma, and all their descendants. Researchers like Unwin, have traditionally defined the dubious family Pterodactylidae in such a way to ensure it is nested within the clade Ctenochasmatoidea. In 2003, Unwin defined the same clade (Pterodactylus + Pterodaustro), but erected the name Euctenochasmatia instead of Pterodactylidae for his conclusion.

Another subgroup within Archaeopterodactyloidea is Ctenochasmatoidea. Ctenochasmatoidea was first named as the subfamily Ctenochasmatinae by Franz Nopcsa. Under the International Code of Zoological Nomenclature, this makes Nopcsa the author of Ctenochasmatidae and Ctenochasmatoidea as well. The modern clade Ctenochasmatoidea was defined by David Unwin in 2003 as the clade containing Cycnorhamphus suevicus, Pterodaustro guinazui, their most recent common ancestor, and all its descendants. Below is a cladogram showing the results of a phylogenetic analysis presented by Steven Vidovic and David Martill, using the earliest available definitions for each clade name. Unwin had considered Euctenochasmatia to be a subgroup within Ctenochasmatoidea, similar to his former conclusion of Pterodactylidae, but most analyses have since found the genus Pterodactylus to be more primitive than previously thought, making the clade Euctenochasmatia the more inclusive group containing both Pterodactylus and Ctenochasmatoidea.

In 2017, Steven Vidovic and David Martill recovered a significantly different set of relationships for early pterodactyloids in their own analysis. They recovered Archaeopterodactyloidea, as it is traditionally conceived of, as a paraphyletic group. Under a strictly cladistical framework, this would imply that the majority of pterodactyloids are part of Archaeopterodactyloidea, including azhdarchoids, pteranodontians, and ornithocheiromorphs.

- Pterodactyloidea
  - Eosipterus
  - Archaeopterodactyloidea
    - Pterodactylus
    - Lophocratia
      - Eupterodactyloidea
      - Euctenochasmatia
        - Diopecephalus
        - Ctenochasmatoidea
          - Ctenochasmatidae
          - Aurorazhdarchia
            - Aerodactylus
            - - Gallodactylidae
              - Aurorazhdarchidae
                - Huanhepterus
                - - Ardeadactylus
                  - Aurorazhdarcho

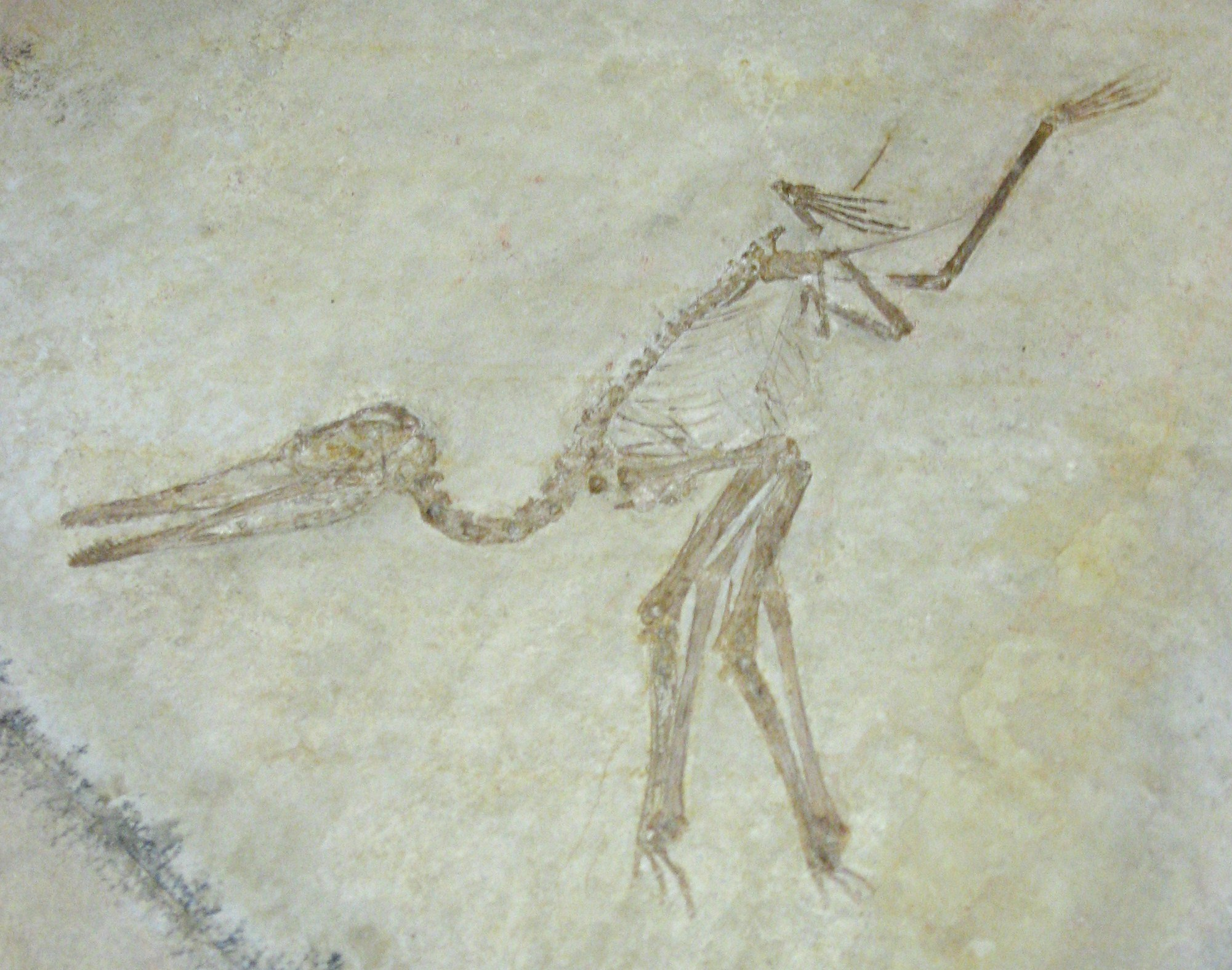
Specimen of aurorazhdarchid Aurorazhdarcho

Below is cladogram following a topology recovered by Brian Andres, using the most recent iteration of his data set (Andres, 2021). Andres' analysis found Pterodactylus to be a close relative of the ctenochasmatoids. Andre's analysis found the "aurorazhdarchian" group recovered by the analysis of Vidovic and Martill to mostly be members of the Ctenochasmatidae, with only a small group of gallodactylids falling outside that group.

- Pterodactyloidea
  - Kryptodrakon
  - - Propterodactylus
    - Lophocratia
      - Eupterodactyloidea
      - Archaeopterodactyloidea
        - Germanodactylidae
        - Euctenochasmatia
          - Pterodactylus
          - Ctenochasmatoidea
            - Gallodactylidae
            - Ctenochasmatidae

== Subclades ==
Summary of the given phylogenetic definitions of clades in Archaeopterodactyloidea.

| Name | Named by | Definition | Notes |
|---|---|---|---|
| Archaeopterodactyloidea | Kellner, 1996 | The smallest clade containing Pterodactylus antiquus, Ctenochasma elegans, and Germanodactylus cristatus | May include all other subclades of pterodactyloids if ctenochasmatids are more closely related to Eupterodactyloidea than either are to Pterodactylus |
| Aurorazhdarchia | Vidovic & Martill, 2018 | The smallest clade containing Aerodactylus scolopaciceps and Aurorazhdarcho micronyx | May be synonymous with Ctenochasmatidae when both Aerodactylus and Aurorazhdarcho are ctenochasmatids |
| Ctenochasmatidae | Nopcsa, 1928 | The smallest clade containing Gnathosaurus subulatus and Pterodaustro guinazui | |
| Ctenochasmatinae | Nopcsa, 1928 | The largest clade containing Ctenochasma elegans, but not Gnathosaurus subulatus | |
| Ctenochasmatoidea | Unwin, 1995 | The smallest clade containing Cycnorhamphus suevicus and Pterodaustro guinazui | Traditionally includes the families Ctenochasmatidae and Gallodactylidae |
| Euctenochasmatia | Unwin, 2003 | The smallest clade containing Pterodactylus antiquus and Pterodaustro guinazui | May include all other subclades of pterodactyloids if ctenochasmatids are more closely related to Eupterodactyloidea than either are to Pterodactylus |
| Germanodactylidae | Young, 1964 | The smallest clade containing Germanodactylus cristatus and Normannognathus wellnhoferi | |
| Gnathosaurinae | Unwin, 2000 | The smallest clade containing Gnathosaurus subulatus and Huanhepterus quingyangensis | |
| Moganopterinae | Lü et al., 2012 | The smallest clade containing Moganopterus zhuiana and Feilongus youngi | May be included in Aurorazhdarchia when that clade is recovered |
| Pterodaustrini | Andres et al., 2014 | The largest clade containing Pterodaustro guinazui, but not Ctenochasma elegans | |

== See also ==
- List of pterosaur genera
- Pterosaur size
- Timeline of pterosaur research
