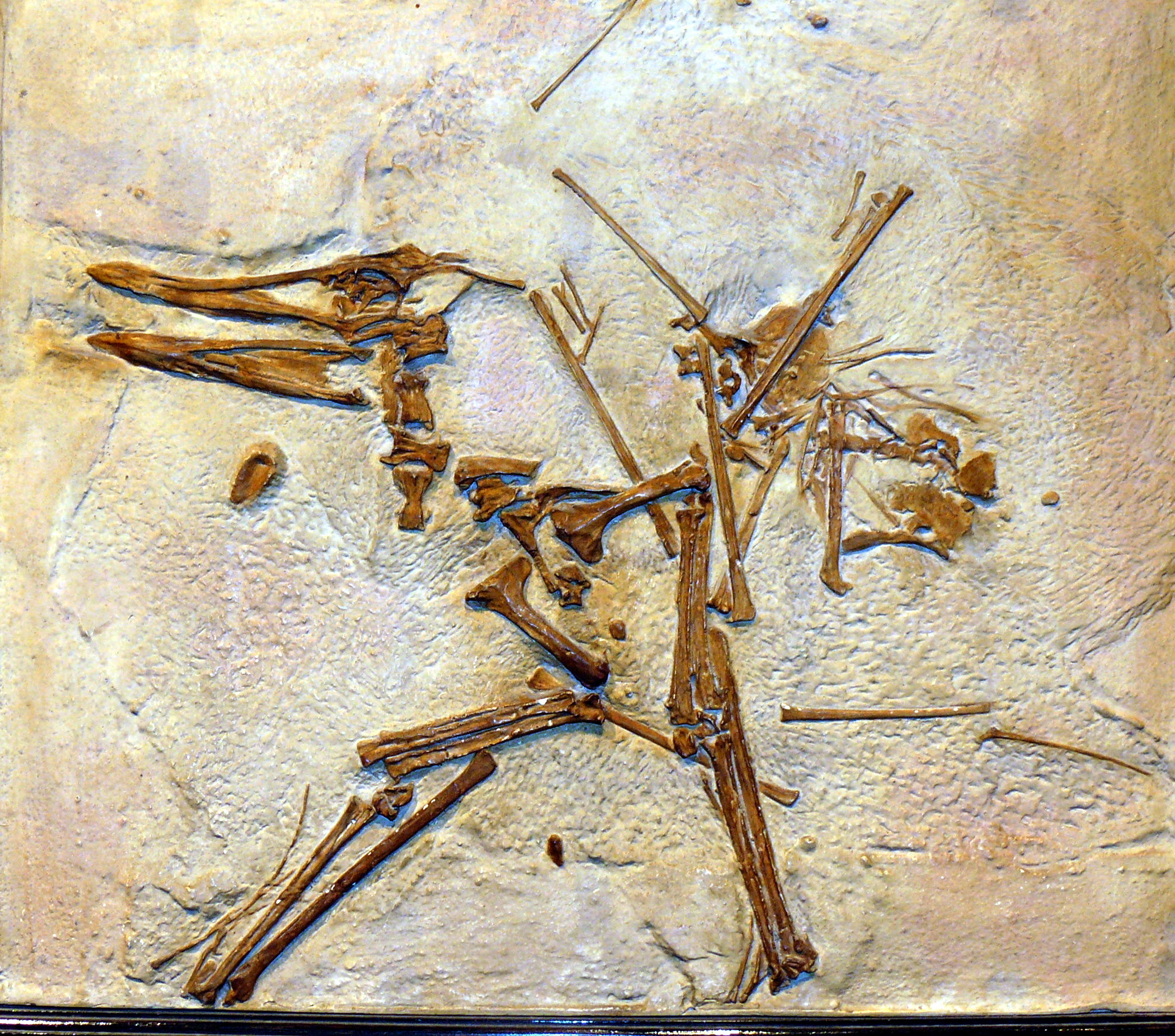
- Juvenile specimen

Scientific classification
- Kingdom: Animalia
- Phylum: Chordata
- Class: Reptilia
- Order: †Pterosauria
- Suborder: †Pterodactyloidea
- Clade: †Ctenochasmatoidea
- Family: †Gallodactylidae
- Genus: †Cycnorhamphus; Seeley, 1870
- Species: †C. suevicus

Binomial name
- †Cycnorhamphus suevicus (Quenstedt, 1855)

Synonyms
- Genus synonymy: Gallodactylus Fabre, 1974; Species synonymy: Pterodactylus wuerttembergicus Quenstedt, 1854 (nomen oblitum); Pterodactylus suevicus Quenstedt, 1855; Pterodactylus eurychirus Wagner, 1857; Pterodactylus (Ornithocephalus) eurychirus (Wagner, 1857); Pterodactylus suevicus eurychirus (Wagner, 1857); Gallodactylus canjuersensis Fabre, 1974

= Cycnorhamphus =

Cycnorhamphus Temporal range: Late Jurassic, 152 Ma

Genus of gallodactylid pterosaur Late Jurassic

Cycnorhamphus (meaning "swan beak") is a genus of gallodactylid ctenochasmatoid pterosaur from the Late Jurassic period of France and Germany, about 152 million years ago. It is synonymous with the genus Gallodactylus.

== History ==
In 1855, a fossil in a plate of shale from the Kimmeridgian, found near Nusplingen in Württemberg, holotype GPIT "Orig. Quenstedt 1855, Taf. 1" or GPIT 80, was named Pterodactylus suevicus by Friedrich August Quenstedt. The specific name refers to the tribal area of Suevia. Quenstedt had earlier mentioned the find in a letter to Professor Heinrich Georg Bronn, which was published in 1854. In it he used the name Pterodactylus württembergicus. In 1855 and 1858, Christian Erich Hermann von Meyer adopted this older species name but it would be forgotten afterwards. The publication in 1854 was not meant to be a nomenclatural act. According to Peter Wellnhofer, Pterodactylus württembergicus should be considered a nomen oblitum.

In 1858, Johann Andreas Wagner described a second specimen consisting of the wings, a shinbone and a foot. He named it Pterodactylus (Ornithocephalus) eurychirus, "the broad-handed", but later in the same publication used the name Pterodactylus suevicus eurychirus as if it were a subspecies. This is today considered a junior synonym. The specimen was acquired by the Bayerische Staatssammlung für Paläontologie und Geologie but was lost in April 1944 during the Munich bombardment.

In 1870, Harry Govier Seeley assigned P. suevicus to a new genus: Cycnorhamphus. The name is derived from Greek κύκνος, kyknos, "swan" and ράμφος, ramphos, "beak", in reference to the snout shape. The type species of this genus is Pterodactylus suevicus, the combinatio nova is Cycnorhamphus suevicus.

In 1878, Oscar Fraas referred a specimen of Pterodactylus longicollum, the later Exemplar Nr 58, to Pterodactylus suevicus. Seeley made this the type specimen of yet another species: Cycnorhamphus Fraasii, in 1891.

In 1907 however, Felix Plieninger rejected the split between Pterodactylus and Cycnorhamphus and denied the validity of C. fraasii. This would be the standard interpretation, shared by most paleontologists, for over sixty years.

During the late 1960s, the Ghirardi family began to exploit the chalkstone quarries of Les Besson, located on the French army base of Canjuers near Aiguines. A Lagerstätte proved to be present from which many high quality fossils could be collected. One of these was a slab showing a pterosaur. The precise time and location of this discovery are unknown. It was first reported in the scientific literature in 1971, by Léonard Ginsburg and Guy Mennessier. In 1974, French paleontologist Jacques Fabre based on this specimen, MNHN CNJ-71, named a new species Gallodactylus canjuersensis. The generic name combines a reference to Gallia with Greek daktylos, "finger". He concluded it was the same genus as P. suevicus, but did not revive Cycnorhamphus, judging that the latter name was unavailable because of mistakes in the diagnosis by Seeley, already pointed out by Plieninger. P. suevicus thus became Gallodactylus suevicus. In 1976, Fabre again named the species, describing it in greater detail but not mentioning the earlier publication. This confused later researchers who mistakenly assumed that 1976 was the formal naming date. In fact the 1974 paper contains a sufficient description and the species was validly named that year. In 1983, the Ghirardis sold their entire collection to the National Museum of Natural History, France.

However, in 1996, Christopher Bennett pointed out that such mistakes do not invalidate a name and that therefore Cycnorhamphus has priority, making Gallodactylus canjuersensis C. canjuersensis. In 2010 and 2012, Bennett published further re-studies of the fossils, concluding that the differences between the two species could be explained by age, sex or individual variation, and formally synonymized C. canjuersensis and C. suevicus.

== Description ==
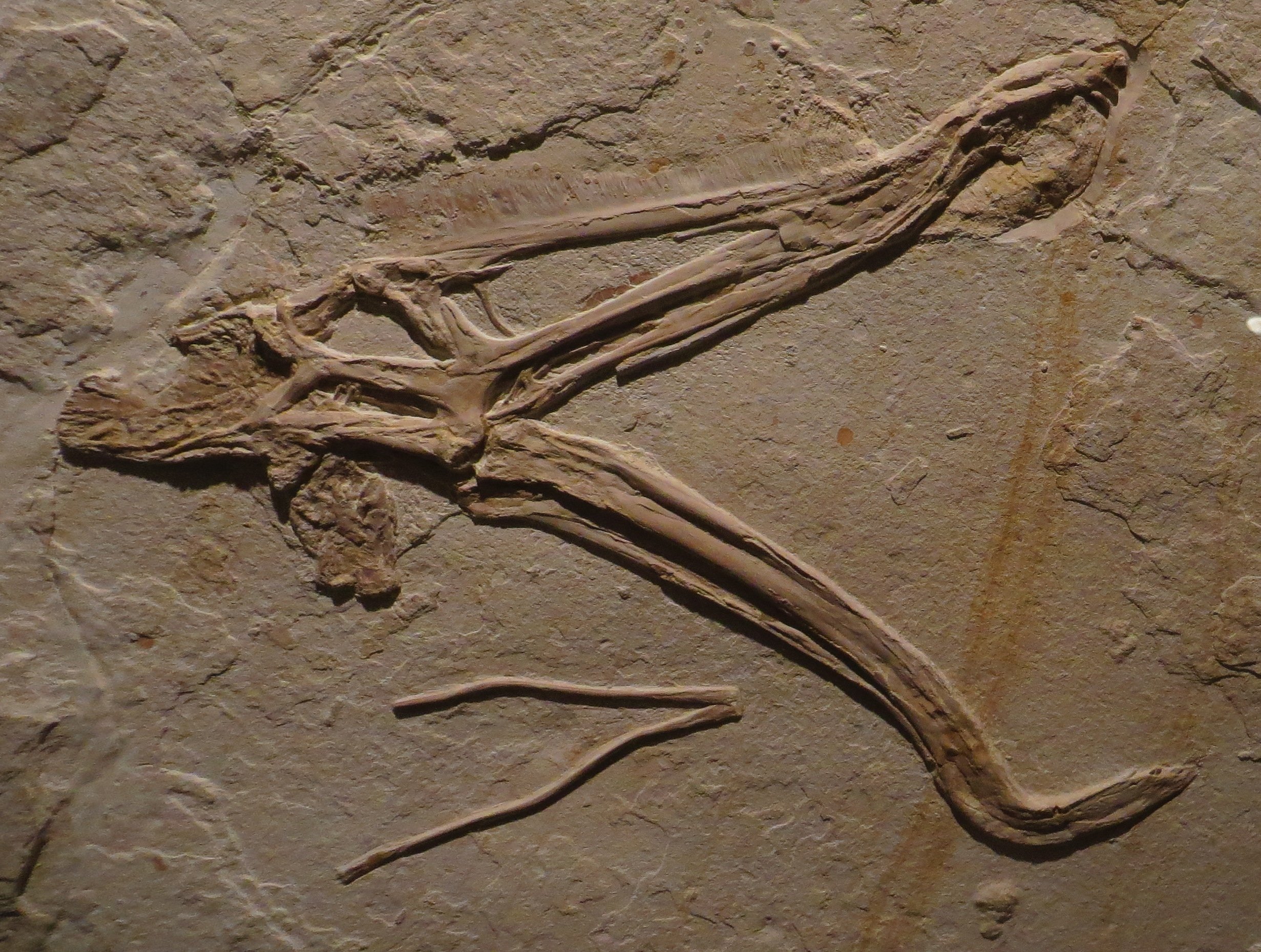
Skull of the "Painten Pelican", Burgmeister Muller Museum

Cycnorhamphus had historically been assumed to have had long jaws with teeth at the very tip, akin to those of Pterodactylus antiquus. However, recent work on a specimen nicknamed "The Painten Pelican" has revealed that the animal possesses a very unusual jaw anatomy, with peg-like teeth at the jaw tips - blunter and stouter in older individuals -, jaw curvatures behind said teeth that form angled arcs away from the biting surface, forming thus an opening, and two poorly understood soft tissue structures occupying this opening from the upper jaw, showing mineralization. The purpose of these adaptations is unknown, but they are more obvious and well developed in adult animals. It has been speculated that the jaws functioned similar to those of openbill storks, allowing the animal to hold hard invertebrates like mollusks and either crush or bisect them.

== Classification ==
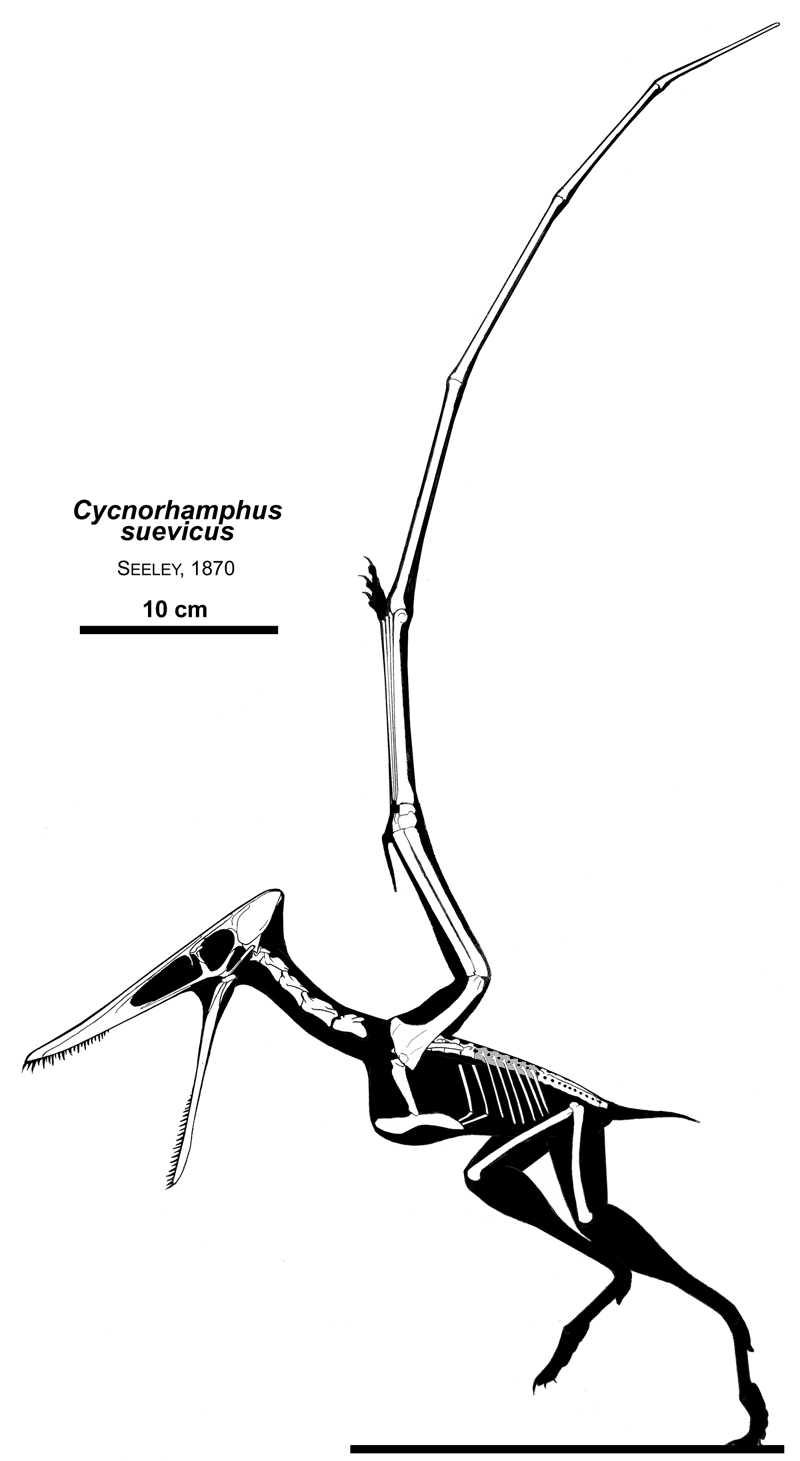
Skeletal diagram

As illustrated below, the results of a topology are based on a phylogenetic analysis made by Longrich, Martill, and Andres in 2018. They placed the Cycnorhamphus within the clade Euctenochasmatia, more precisely within the family Gallodactylidae, sister taxon to Normannognathus.

- Archaeopterodactyloidea
  - Germanodactylidae
    - Germanodactylus cristatus
    - Germanodactylus rhamphastinus
  - Euctenochasmatia
    - Pterodactylus antiquus
    - Ctenochasmatoidea
      - Gallodactylidae
        - Cycnorhamphus suevicus
        - Normannognathus wellnhoferi
      - Ctenochasmatidae

== See also ==
- List of pterosaur genera
- Timeline of pterosaur research
