= Daiting =

- Municipality
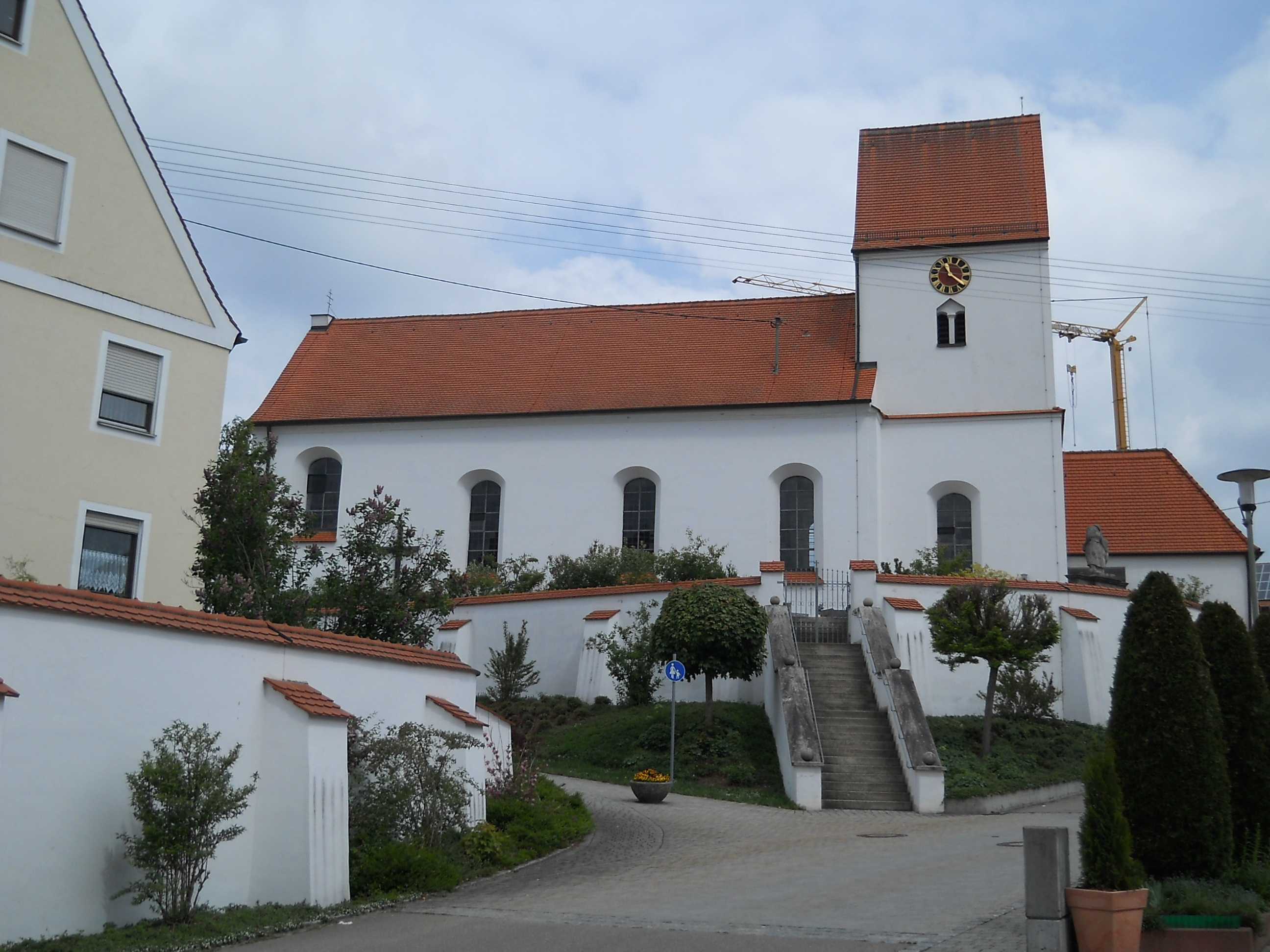
- Church of Saint Martin

- Coat of arms

- Location of Daiting within Donau-Ries district
- Interactive map of Daiting
- Location within Germany Location within Bavaria
- Coordinates: 48°48′N 10°54′E
- Country: Germany
- State: Bavaria
- Admin. region: Schwaben
- District: Donau-Ries
- Municipal assoc.: Monheim

Government
  - Mayor (2020–26): Roland Wildfeuer

Area
  - Total: 25.46 km^{2} (9.83 sq mi)
- Elevation: 445 m (1,460 ft)

Population (2025-12-31)
  - Total: 800
  - Density: 31/km^{2} (81/sq mi)
- Time zone: UTC+01:00 (CET)
  - Summer (DST): UTC+02:00 (CEST)
- Postal codes: 86653
- Dialling codes: 09091
- Vehicle registration: DON
- Website: www.gemeinde-daiting.de

Daiting (German pronunciation: [ˈdaɪtɪŋ]) is a municipality in the district of Donau-Ries in Bavaria in Germany.

== Archaeopteryx - Daiting Specimen ==
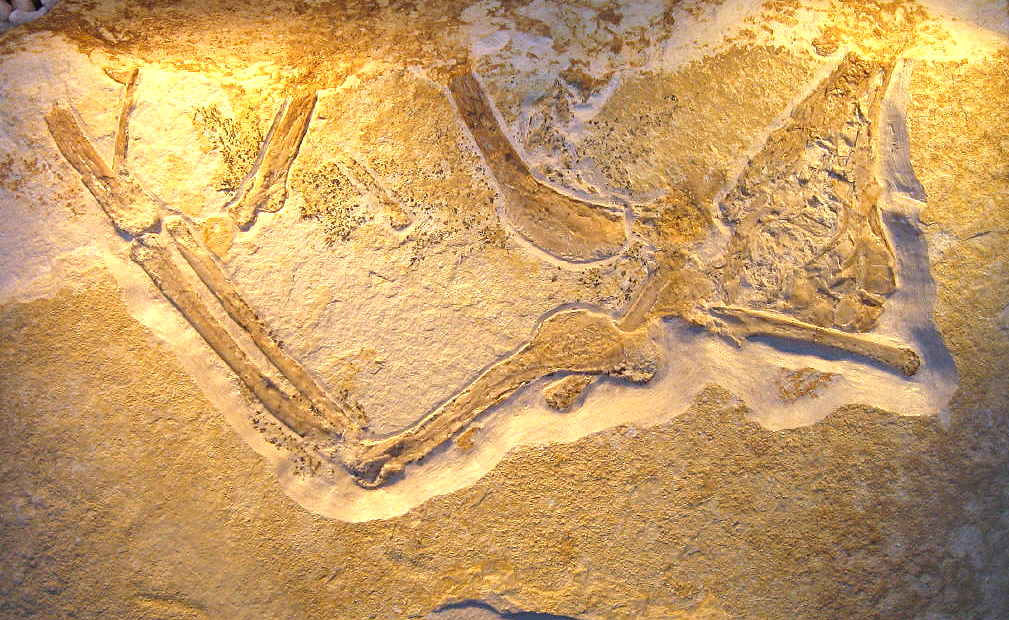
Daiting Specimen

An eighth, fragmentary specimen of Archaeopteryx was discovered in the late 1980s in the somewhat younger sediments at Daiting. It is therefore known as the Daiting Specimen, and has been known since 1996 only from a cast, briefly shown at the Naturkundemuseum in Bamberg. Long having been missing and therefore dubbed the 'Phantom', it was purchased by palaeontologist Raimund Albertsdörfer in 2009. It was on display for the first time with six other original fossils of Archaeopteryx at the Munich Mineral Show in October 2009. A first, quick look by scientists indicate that this specimen might represent a new species of Archaeopteryx. It was found in a limestone bed that was a few hundred thousand years younger than the other finds.

The quarry the specimen had been found has since been infilled. The area of the former quarry is in the possession of the municipality of Daiting, which does not have the financial means to carry out research. Daiting had expressions of interest for the area but has not decided as to whether it will sell it into private ownership.
