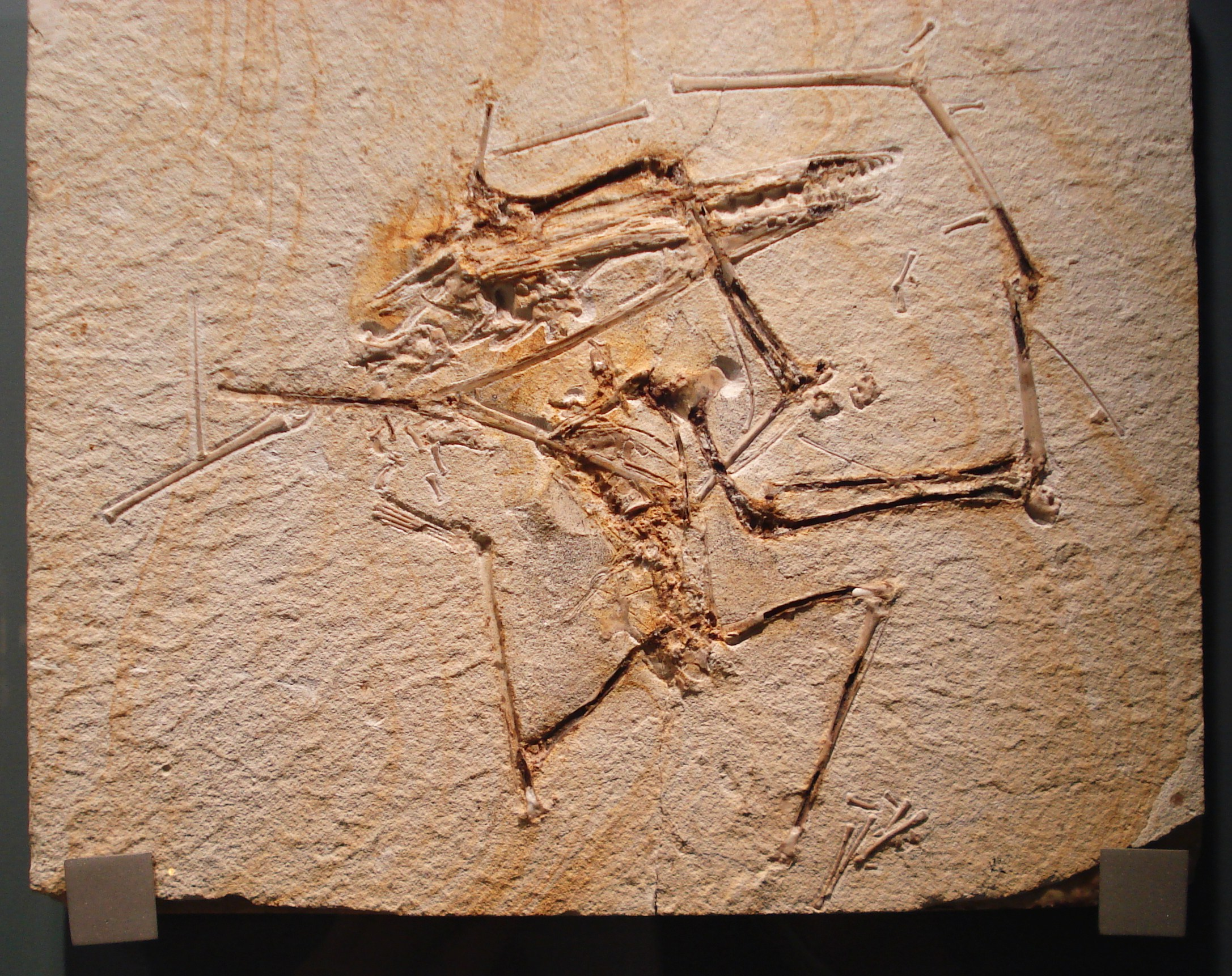
- Specimen JME Moe 12 in Jura Museum Eichstätt

Scientific classification
- Kingdom: Animalia
- Phylum: Chordata
- Class: Reptilia
- Order: †Pterosauria
- Suborder: †Pterodactyloidea
- Infraorder: †Eupterodactyloidea
- Genus: †Altmuehlopterus; Vidovic & Martill, 2017
- Species: †A. rhamphastinus

Binomial name
- †Altmuehlopterus rhamphastinus (Wagner, 1851)

= Altmuehlopterus =

Altmuehlopterus Temporal range: 152–145 Ma

Genus of pterodactyloid pterosaur from the Late Jurassic

Altmuehlopterus (meaning "Altmühl River wing") is a genus of pterosaur belonging to the Pterodactyloidea. It lived in the Late Jurassic of what is now Germany. It was formerly known as "Daitingopterus" (meaning "Daiting Wing"), a nomen nudum, informally coined in 2004.

== Discovery and naming ==
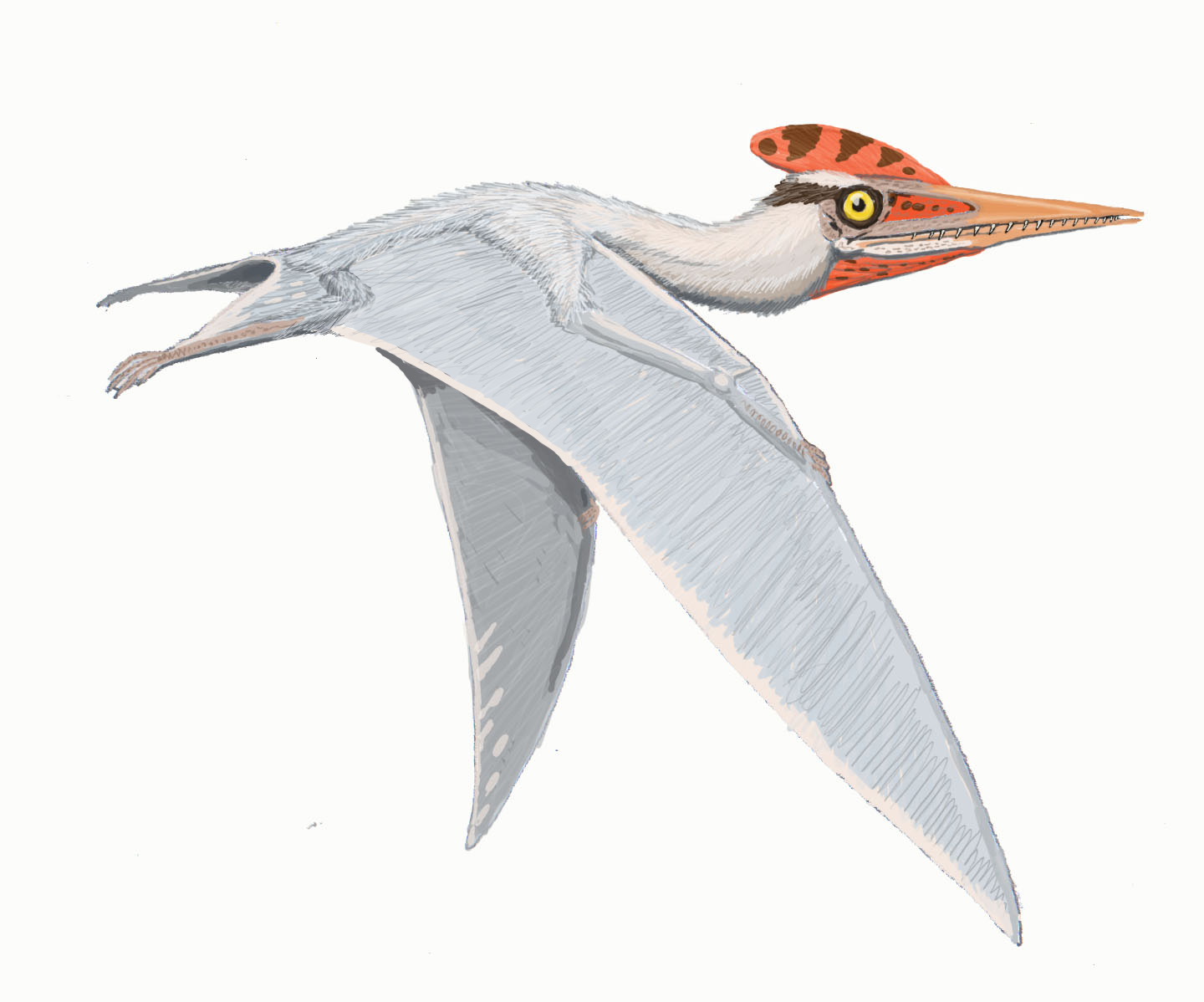
Restoration

In 1851, Johann Andreas Wagner named a new species of Ornithocephalus (a now-obsolete name for the genus Pterodactylus), Ornithocephalus ramphastinus. The specific name referred to the toucan genus Ramphastos, in view of the large beak-like snout of the pterosaur. In 1859/1860, Christian Erich Hermann von Meyer corrected the specific name to rhamphastinus. Although this was incorrect by modern standards, the new spelling has become valid by being accepted and used by subsequent authors, under article ICZN 33.3.1.

The holotype, BSP AS.I.745, was probably found at Mörnsheim near Daiting in a layer of the Malm Zeta 3, dating from the Tithonian. It consists of a partly articulated skeleton with skull, preserved on a plate and counterplate.

In 1871, Harry Govier Seeley included the specimen in the type material of Diopecephalus, without, however, designating it as the holotype of this genus. For this reason, Peter Wellnhofer felt free to name the specimen as a second species of Germanodactylus in 1970: Germanodactylus rhamphastinus. In 2004, Michael Maisch e.a. concluded that it represented a new genus, which they indicated as "Daitingopterus" in a diagram. It remained a nomen nudum.

In 2017, Steven Vidovic and David Martill validly named a separate genus Altmuehlopterus. The generic name combines a reference to the river Altmühl, running through Solnhofen, with a Latinised Greek pteron, "wing".

== See also ==
- List of pterosaur genera
- Timeline of pterosaur research
