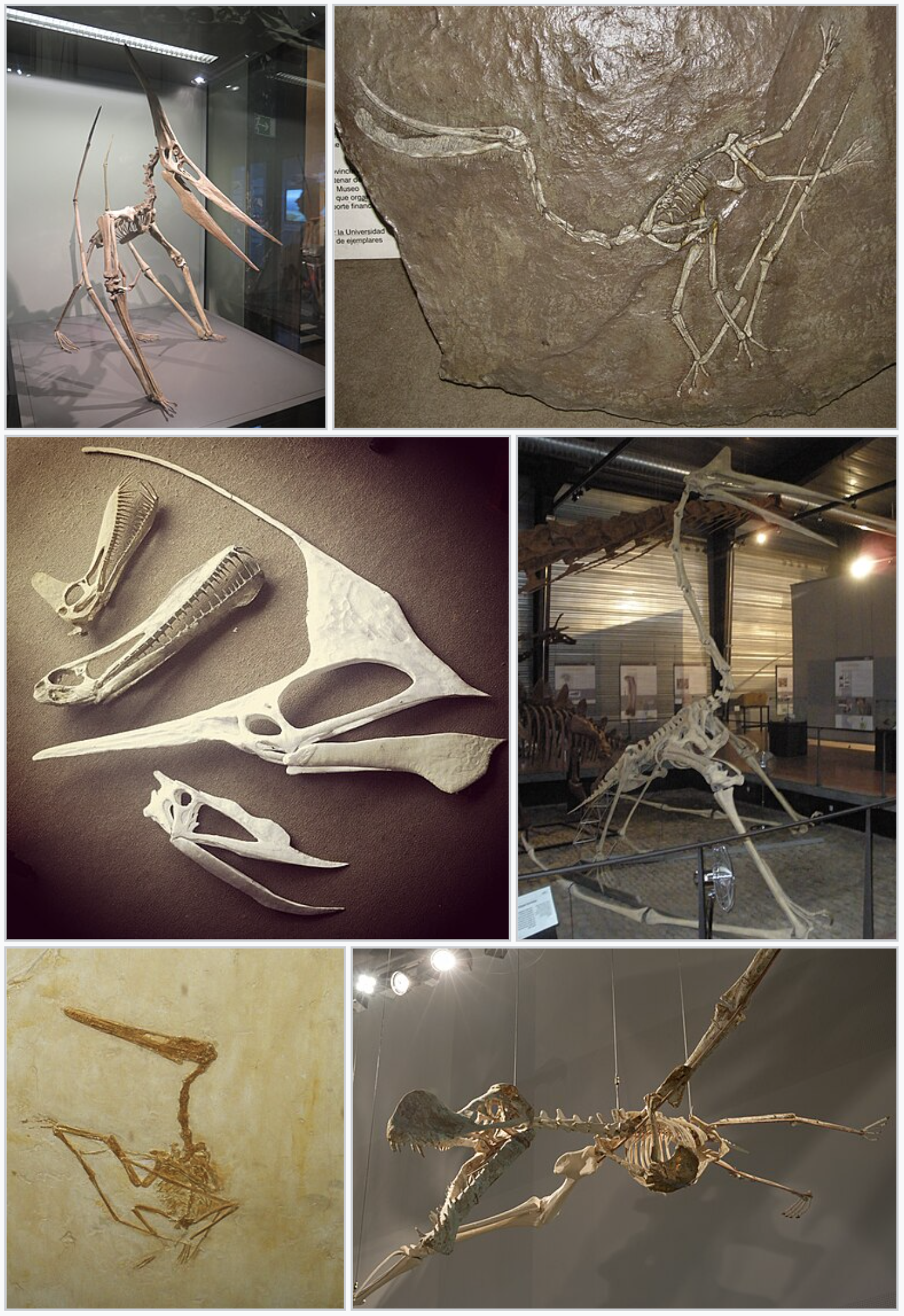
- Several members of Pterodactyloidea (top to bottom): Pteranodon, Pterodaustro, the skulls of several pterosaurs (Guidraco, Anhanguera, Tupandactylus, and an unnamed dsungaripterid), Quetzalcoatlus, Aerodactylus, and Maaradactylus

Scientific classification
- Kingdom: Animalia
- Phylum: Chordata
- Class: Reptilia
- Order: †Pterosauria
- Clade: †Pterodactyliformes
- Suborder: †Pterodactyloidea; Plieninger, 1901

Subgroups
- †Diopecephalus; †Kryptodrakon?; †Ningchengopterus (incertae sedis); †Pangupterus (incertae sedis); †Wenupteryx (incertae sedis); †Archaeopterodactyloidea; †Eupterodactyloidea Bennett, 1994; †Herbstosaurus; †Azhdarchoidea; †Dsungaripteridae; †Germanodactylidae?; †Pteranodontoidea

Synonyms
- Dracochira Haeckel, 1895

= Pterodactyloidea =

Pterodactyloids Temporal range: Late Jurassic – Late Cretaceous, 152–66 Ma Possible Middle Jurassic - Bathonian record

Suborder of monofenestratan pterosaurs

Pterodactyloidea (/ˌtɛrəˈdæktl̩ɔɪdɪːə/; derived from the Greek words πτερόν (pterón, for usual ptéryx) "wing", and δάκτυλος (dáktylos) "finger") is one of the two traditional suborders of pterosaurs ("wing lizards"), and contains the most derived members of this group of flying reptiles. They appeared during the middle Jurassic Period, and differ from the basal (though paraphyletic) rhamphorhynchoids by their short tails and long wing metacarpals (hand bones). The most advanced forms also lack teeth, and by the late Cretaceous, all known pterodactyloids were toothless. Many species had well-developed crests on the skull, a form of display taken to extremes in giant-crested forms like Nyctosaurus and Tupandactylus. Pterodactyloids were the last surviving pterosaurs when the order became extinct at the end of the Cretaceous Period, together with the non-avian dinosaurs and most marine reptiles.

"Pterodactyl" is also a common term for pterodactyloid pterosaurs, though it can also be used to refer to Pterodactylus specifically. Well-known examples of pterodactyloids include Pterodactylus, Pteranodon, and Quetzalcoatlus.

In 2014, fossils from the Shishugou Formation of China were classified as the most basal pterodactyloid yet found, Kryptodrakon. At a minimum age of about 161 my, it is about 5 million years older than the oldest previously known confirmed specimens. Some later studies have found Kryptodrakon to be a non-pterodactyloid. Previously, a fossil jaw recovered from the Middle Jurassic (Bathonian) Stonesfield Slate formation was considered the oldest known, but further examination suggested it belonged to a teleosaurid instead of a pterosaur. In 2018 Michael O'Sullivan and David Martill described a partial synsacrum from the Stonesfield Slate identified as possibly pterodactyloid, though they noted it could also be a wukongopterid. If correctly identified, it would be the oldest pterodactyloid fossil known. In 2022 Martill and colleagues described a likely ctenochasmatid tooth, also from Stonesfield.

== Classification ==
Pterodactyloidea is traditionally considered to be the group of short-tailed pterosaurs with long wrists (metacarpus), compared with the relatively long tails and short wrist bones of basal pterosaurs ("rhamphorhynchoids"). In 2004, Kevin Padian formally defined Pterodactyloidea as an apomorphy-based clade containing those species possessing a metacarpal at least 80% of the length of the humerus, homologous with that of Pterodactylus. This definition was adopted by the PhyloCode in 2020.

=== Subgroups ===
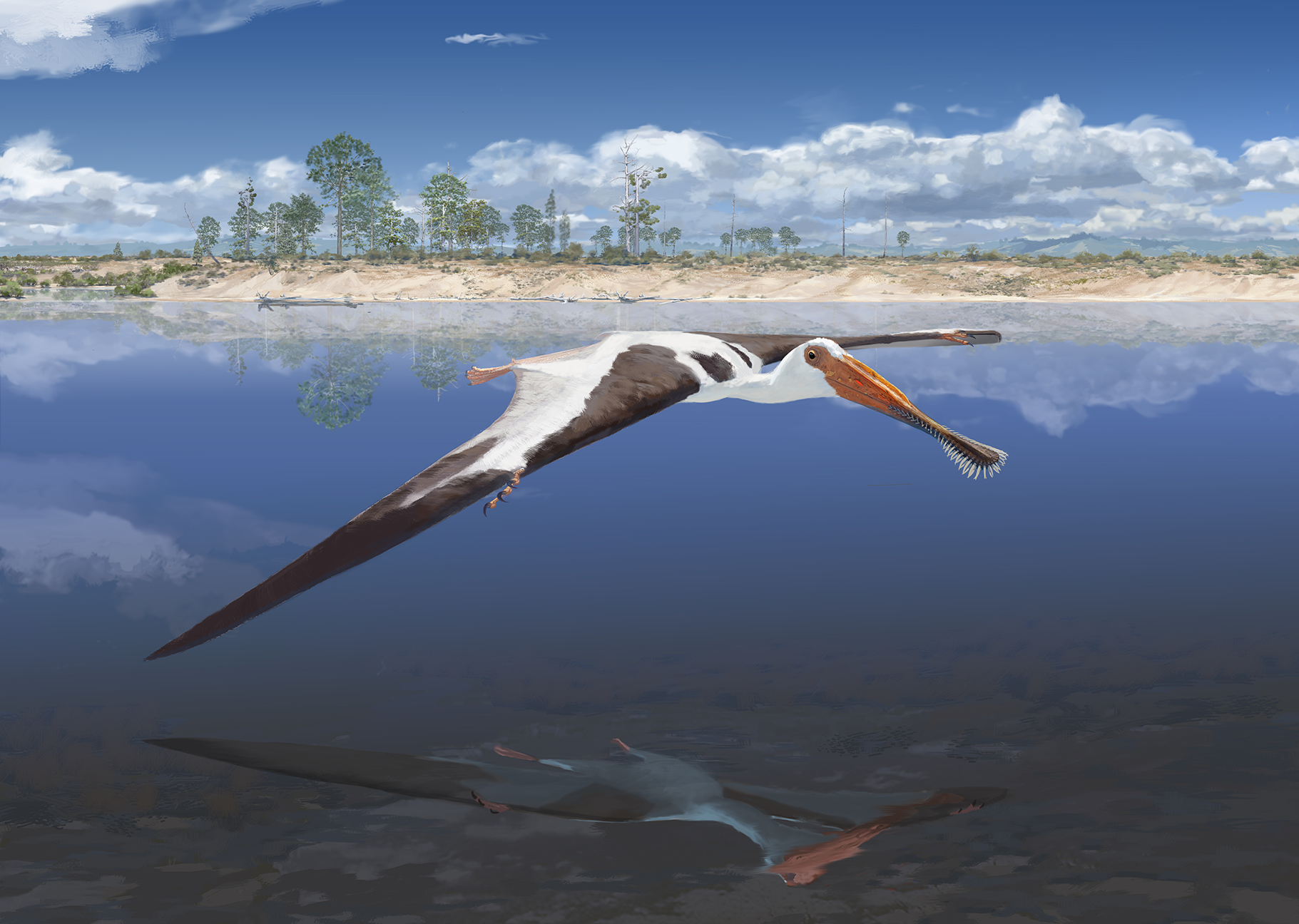
Reconstruction of Lusognathus, a ctenochasmatoid

A subgroup of pterodactyloids, called the Lophocratia, was named by David Unwin in 2003. Unwin defined the group as the most recent common ancestor of Pterodaustro guinazui and Quetzalcoatlus northropi, and all its descendants. This group was named for the presence of a head crest in most known species, though this feature has since been found in more primitive pterosaurs and was probably an ancestral feature for all pterodactyloids.

Another subgroup within Lophocratia is Eupterodactyloidea (meaning "true Pterodactyloidea"). Eupterodactyloidea was named by S. Christopher Bennett in 1994 as an infraorder of the suborder Pterodactyloidea. Bennett defined it as an apomorphy-based clade. However, in 2010, Brian Andres re-defined the group as a stem-based taxon in his dissertation, and then formalized the definition in 2014 as all pterosaurs more closely related to Pteranodon longiceps than to Pterodactylus antiquus. The slightly more exclusive group Ornithocheiroidea was re-defined in 2003 by Alexander Kellner. He defined it as the least inclusive clade containing Anhanguera blittersdorffi, Pteranodon longiceps, Dsungaripterus weii, and Quetzalcoatlus northropi. Ornithocheiroidea has often been used for a much more exclusive group including only the branch of traditional ornithocheirid pterosaurs, though this use has since fallen out of favor by many researchers after years of competing definitions for the various pterodactyloid clades. The compromise definitions by Andres and others have since become more widely adopted.

Within Eupterodactyloidea, there is a large clade - Ornithocheiroidea. The name Ornithocheiroidea was originally defined as an apomorphy-based taxon by Christopher Bennett in 1994. It was given a relationship-based definition in 2003 by Alexander Kellner, who defined it as the least inclusive clade containing Anhanguera blittersdorffi, Pteranodon longiceps, Dsungaripterus weii, and Quetzalcoatlus northropi. Later that year, David Unwin suggested a more restrictive definition, in which the clade only contains Pteranodon longiceps, Istiodactylus latidens, and their descentants. Brian Andres (2008, 2010, 2014) in his analyses, defined Ornithocheiroidea using the definition of Kellner (2003) to avoid confusion with similarly defined groups, like Pteranodontoidea. In 2019, a phylogenetic analysis conducted by Kellner and colleagues had recovered Ornithocheiroidea as the sister taxon of the Archaeopterodactyloidea, and consisting of the clades Tapejaroidea and Pteranodontoidea. Several recent studies have followed this or a similar concept.

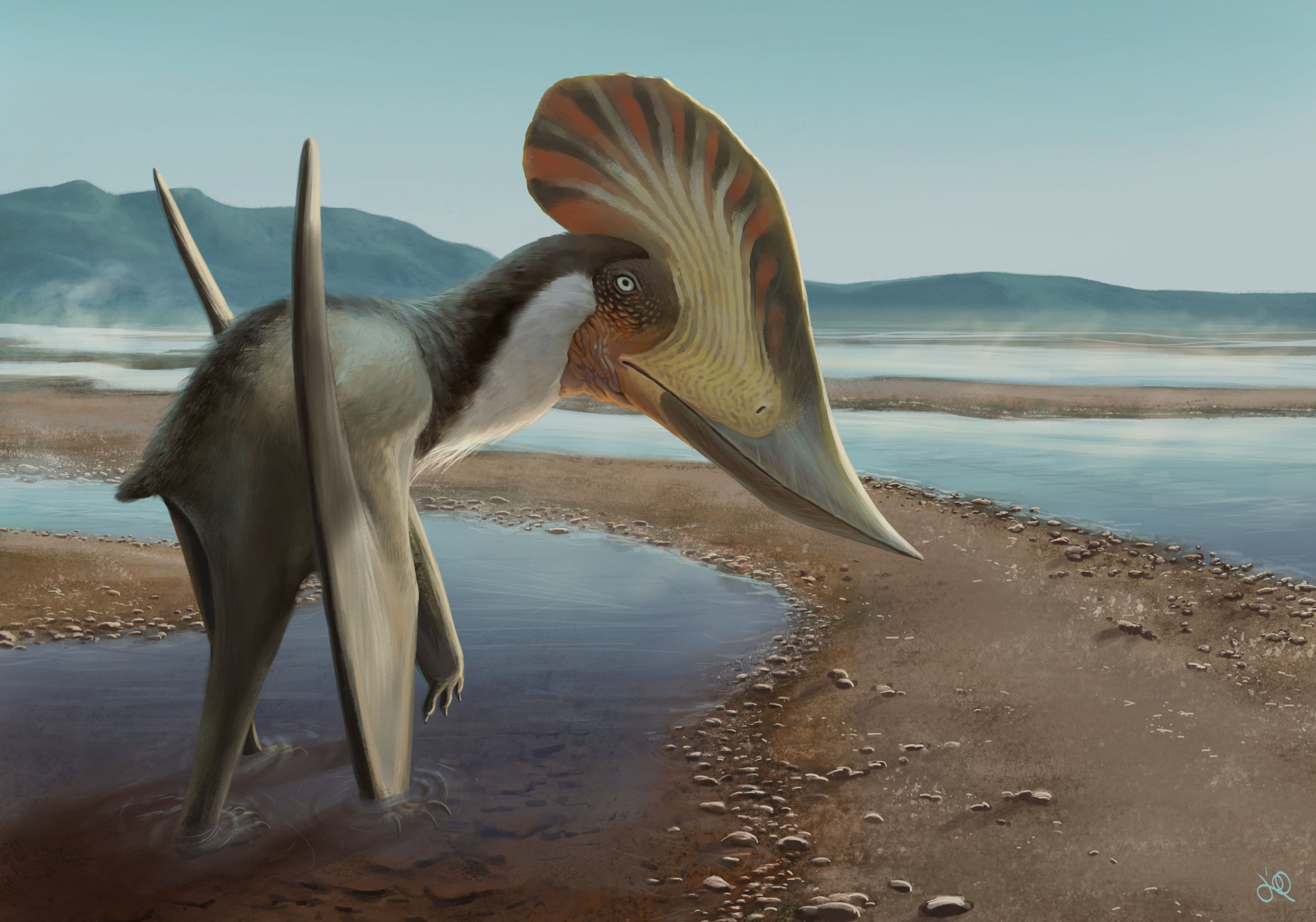
Reconstruction of Kariridraco, a terrestrial azhdarchoid

However, not all of the subgroups of pterodactyloids are universally accepted. One controversial taxon is Tapejaroidea. Tapejaroidea was named by paleontologist Alexander Kellner from Brazil in 1996, and in 2003 it was given a phylogenetic definition by Kellner himself as the most recent common ancestor of Dsungaripterus, Tapejara and Quetzalcoatlus, and all their descendants. Tapejaroidea, in Kellner's 2003 study, was recovered as the sister taxon of the Pteranodontoidea, both within the group Ornithocheiroidea, and consisting of the groups Dsungaripteridae and Azhdarchoidea. However, in a phylogenetic analysis made by Jaime Headden and Hebert Bruno Nascimento Campos in 2014, Tapejaroidea was recovered within the Azhdarchoidea, as a clade comprising the families Tapejaridae and Thalassodromidae. More recently, the original definition of Tapejaroidea has been used in a number of phylogenetic analyses conducted in 2019 and 2020, meaning that Tapejaroidea and Pteranodontoidea were once again recovered as the sister taxa and within the larger Ornithocheiroidea. The cladogram below represents the phylogenetic analysis conducted by Kellner and colleagues in 2019, where they recovered Tapejaroidea as the more inclusive group containing both the Dsungaripteridae and the Azhdarchoidea.

Another controversial clade is Dsungaripteroidea. The Dsungaripteroidea was defined in 2003 by David Unwin. Unwin made Dsungaripteroidea the most inclusive clade containing both Dsungaripterus weii and Germanodactylus cristatus. Unwin at that time considered those two species to be close relatives. However, more recent studies have shown Germanodactylus to be much more primitive, either an archaeopterodactyloid or a primitive member of the Eupterodactyloidea. This makes Dsungaripteroidea a much larger group. Alexander Kellner in 2003 defined Dsungaripteroidea very differently as the group containing the last common ancestor of Nyctosaurus and Quetzalcoatlus, and all its descendants. However, subsequent recent analysis use the name Ornithocheiroidea instead of Dsungaripteroidea for this definition.

Name	Named by	Definition	Notes
Archaeopterodactyloidea	Kellner, 1996	Least-inclusive clade containing Pterodactylus, Ctenochasma, and Gallodactylus	May include all other subclades of pterodactyloids if ctenochasmatids are more closely related to Eupterodactyloidea (see below) than either are to Pterodactylus
Azhdarchoidea	Unwin, 1995	Least-inclusive clade containing both Quetzalcoatlus and Tapejara	
Dsungaripteroidea	Unwin, 2003	Least-inclusive clade containing both Dsungaripterus and Germanodactylus	May be synonymous with Lophocratia if Germanodactylus is a member of Archaeopterodactyloidea; alternatively defined as the least-inclusive clade containing both Quetzalcoatlus and Nyctosaurus (possibly synonymous with Ornithocheiroidea)
Eupterodactyloidea	Bennett, 1994	Most-inclusive clade containing Pteranodon but not Pterodactylus	Possibly synonymous with Ornithocheiroidea
Lophocratia	Unwin, 2003	Least-inclusive clade containing both Pterodaustro and Quetzalcoatlus	
Ornithocheiroidea	Seeley, 1870	Least-inclusive clade containing Anhanguera, Pteranodon, Dsungaripterus, and Quetzalcoatlus	Previously defined as the least-inclusive clade containing both Pteranodon and Istiodactylus (this clade is now called Pteranodontoidea - see below)
Ornithocheiromorpha	Andres et al., 2014	Most-inclusive clade containing Ornithocheirus but not Pteranodon	
Pteranodontia	Marsh, 1887	Least-inclusive clade containing both Pteranodon and Nyctosaurus	May be synonymous with Pteranodontoidea if Pteranodon is more closely related to Ornithocheiromorpha than either are to Nyctosaurus
Pteranodontoidea	Kellner, 1996	Least-inclusive clade containing both Pteranodon and Istiodactylus	
Tapejaroidea	Kellner, 1996	Least-inclusive clade containing Quetzalcoatlus, Tapejara, and Dsungaripterus	May be synonymous with Azhdarchoidea if Dsungaripterus is more closely related to Quetzalcoatlus than either are to Tapejara; alternatively used for a clade containing Tapejaridae and Thalassodromidae

=== Taxonomy ===
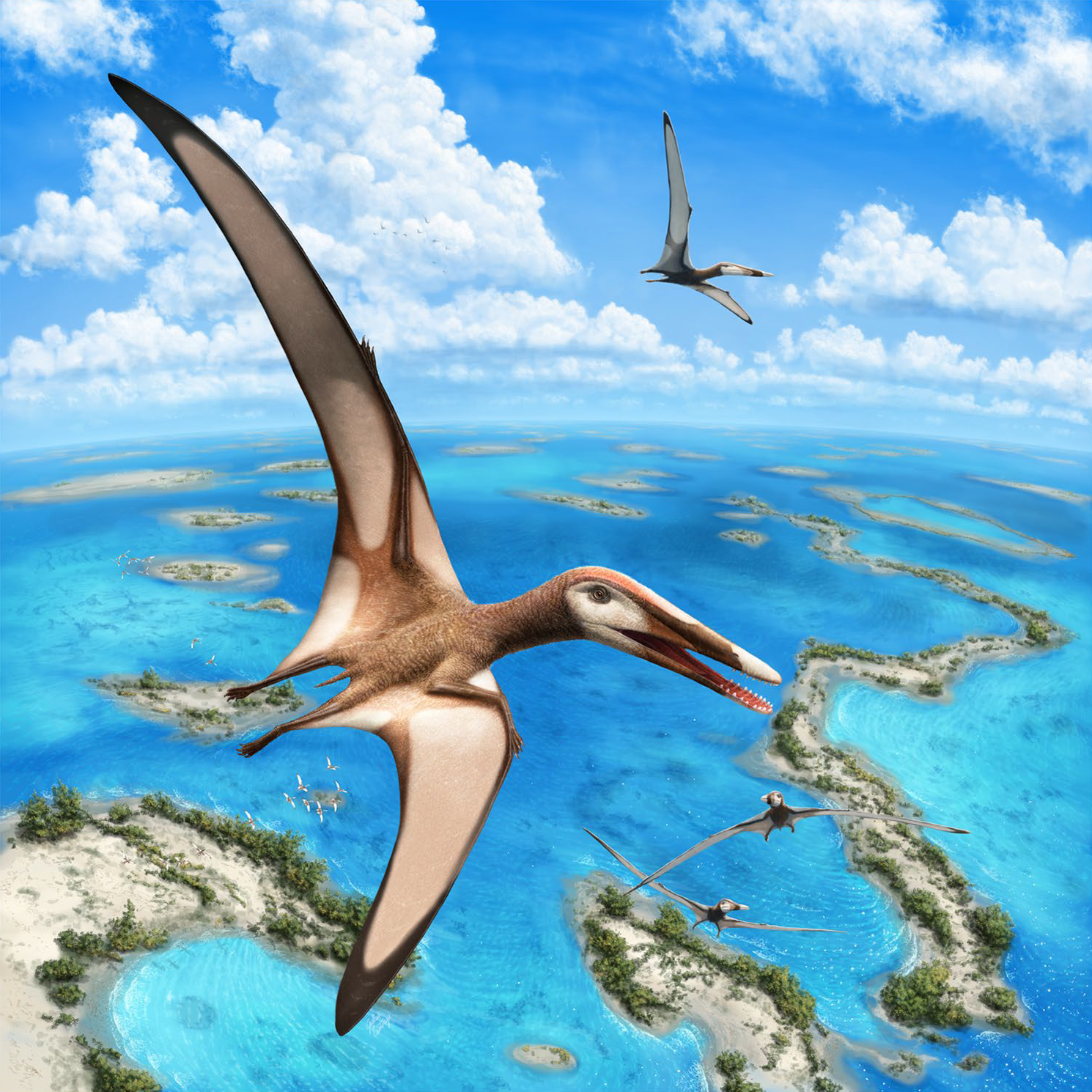
Reconstruction of Mimodactylus, a marine pteranodontoid

There are competing theories of pterodactyloid phylogeny. Below is cladogram following a topology recovered by Brian Andres, using the most recent iteration of his data set (Andres, 2021). This study found the two traditional groupings of ctenochasmatoids and kin as an early branching group, with all other pterodactyloids grouped into the Eupterodactyloidea. A simplified version of the cladogram included in that publication is shown below.

- Pterodactyloidea
  - Kryptodrakon
  - - Propterodactylus
    - Lophocratia
      - Archaeopterodactyloidea
        - Germanodactylidae
        - Euctenochasmatia
          - Pterodactylus
          - Ctenochasmatoidea
      - Eupterodactyloidea
        - Haopterus
        - Ornithocheiroidea
          - Pteranodontoidea
            - Ornithocheiromorpha
            - Pteranodontia
          - Azhdarchoidea
            - Tapejaridae
            - Neoazhdarchia

Some studies based on a different type of analysis have found that this basic division into primitive (archaeopterodactyloid) and advanced (eupterodactyloid) species may not be correct. Beginning in 2014, Steven Vidovic and David Martill constructed an analysis in which several pterosaurs traditionally thought of as archaeopterodactyloids closely related to the ctenochasmatoids may have been more closely related to ornithocheiroids, or in some cases, fall outside both groups. The results of their updated 2017 analysis are shown below.

- Pterodactyloidea
  - Eosipterus yangi
  - - Pterodactylus antiquus
    - Lophocratia
      - Euctenochasmatia
        - Diopecephalus kochi
        - Ctenochasmatoidea
          - Aurorazhdarchia
            - Aerodactylus scolopaciceps
            - - Aurorazhdarchidae
              - Gallodactylidae
          - Ctenochasmatidae
      - Eupterodactyloidea
        - Altmuehlopterus ramphastinus
        - Dsungaripteroidea
          - Germanodactylus cristatus
          - - Elanodactylus prolatus
            - Ornithocheiroidea
              - Dsungaripteromorpha
                - - Lonchodectes compressirostris
                  - - Prejanopterus curvirostra
                    - - Kepodactylus insperatus
                      - Dsungaripteridae
                - Pteranodontoidea
                  - Ornithocheiromorpha
                  - - - Hamipterus tianshanensis
                      - Ikrandraco avatar
                    - - - Istiodactylus
                        - Pteranodontia
                          - Nyctosauridae
                          - Pteranodon
              - Azhdarchoidea
                - Sinopterus dongi
                - - Eoazhdarcho liaoxiensis
                  - Neoazhdarchia
                    - Tapejaromorpha
                    - Bennettazhia oregonensis
                    - Huaxiapterus jii
                    - Thalassodromeus sethi
                    - Tupuxuara leonardii
                    - Azhdarchidae
