= Anatomy of pterosaurs =

Build of Late Jurassic period flying reptiles

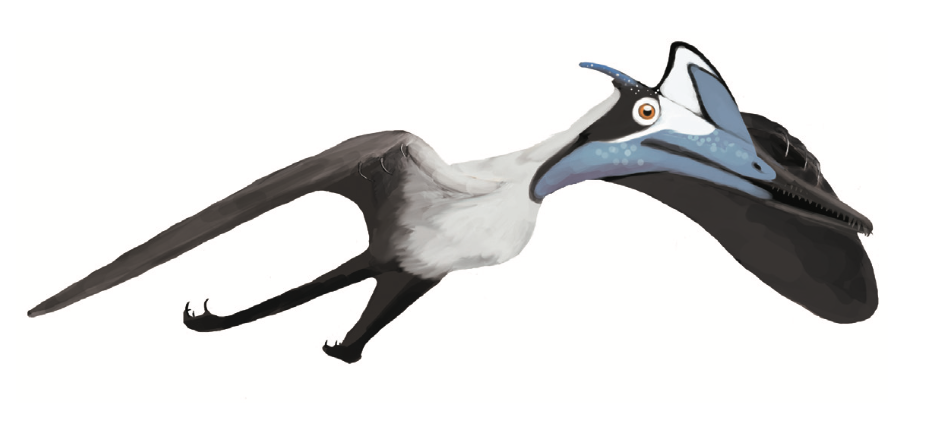
Life reconstruction of Pterodactylus

The anatomy of pterosaurs was highly modified from their reptilian ancestors by the adaptation to flight. The bones of pterosaurs were hollow and air-filled, like those of birds. This provided a higher muscle attachment surface for a given skeletal weight. The bone walls were often paper-thin. They had a large and keeled breastbone for flight muscles and an enlarged brain able to coordinate complex flying behaviour. Pterosaur skeletons often show considerable fusion. In the skull, the sutures between elements disappeared. In some later pterosaurs, the backbone over the shoulders fused into a structure known as a notarium, which served to stiffen the torso during flight, and provide a stable support for the shoulder blade. Likewise, the sacral vertebrae could form a single synsacrum while the pelvic bones fused also.

== Size ==
Wide variation in Late Cretaceous pterosaur size, compared to birds and a human

Pterosaurs were highly diverse in size, and some were the largest flying organisms in earth's history. The group is typically considered to obey Cope's rule, with early pterosaurs of the Triassic and Jurassic periods being small animals with wingspans only up to 2 metres (6.6 ft), most Cretaceous pterosaurs having wingspans above that threshold, and the largest pterosaurs living at the end of the Cretaceous. Some studies have, however, suggested that this is partially due to the incomplete nature of the fossil record. Specimens indicating especially large Jurassic pterosaurs with wingspans above 3 metres (9.8 ft) have been more recently reported, as have pterosaurs with wingspans as low as 1.4 metres (4.6 ft) from the end of the Cretaceous.

Anurognathids may have been the smallest pterosaurs, with wingspans of as small as 0.4 metres (1.3 ft), though the age of these individuals remains uncertain. Nemicolopterus, once considered the smallest pterosaur, is now thought to represent a hatchling. The largest pterosaurs include Tropeognathus, with a wingspan of up to 8.26 metres (27.1 ft), and members of Azhdarchidae such as Hatzegopteryx and Quetzalcoatlus, which could attain estimated wingspans of 10–11 metres (33–36 ft). Though historical estimates considered even these species to be ultralight, modern estimates indicate the largest pterosaurs could weight up to 150–250 kilograms (330–550 lb).

== Skull, teeth, and crests ==
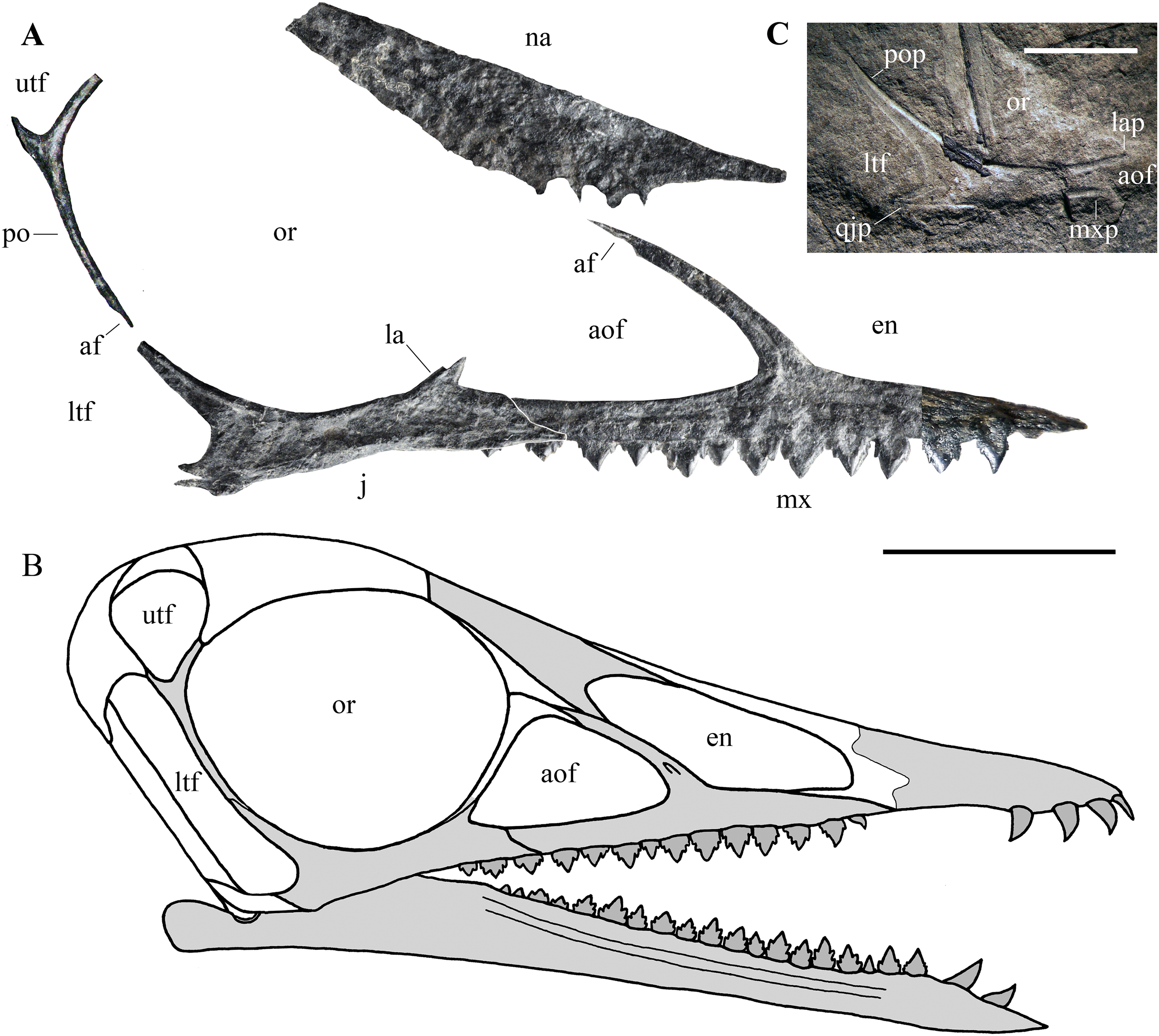
Skull of an early pterosaur, Seazzadactylus

Compared to the other vertebrate flying groups, the birds and bats, pterosaur skulls were typically quite large. Most pterosaur skulls had elongated jaws. Their skull bones tend to be fused in adult individuals. Early pterosaurs often had heterodont teeth, varying in build, and some still had teeth in the palate. In later groups the teeth mostly became conical. Front teeth were often longer in transversely expanded jaw tips to grab prey but size and position were very variable among species. With the derived Pterodactyloidea, the skulls became even more elongated, sometimes surpassing the combined neck and torso in length. This was caused by a stretching and fusion of the front snout bone, the premaxilla, with the upper jawbone, the maxilla. Unlike most archosaurs, the nasal and antorbital openings of pterodactyloid pterosaurs merged into a single large opening, called the nasoantorbital fenestra. This feature likely evolved to lighten the skull for flight. In contrast, the bones behind the eye socket contracted and rotated, strongly inclining the rear skull and bringing the jaw joint forward. The braincase was relatively large for reptiles.

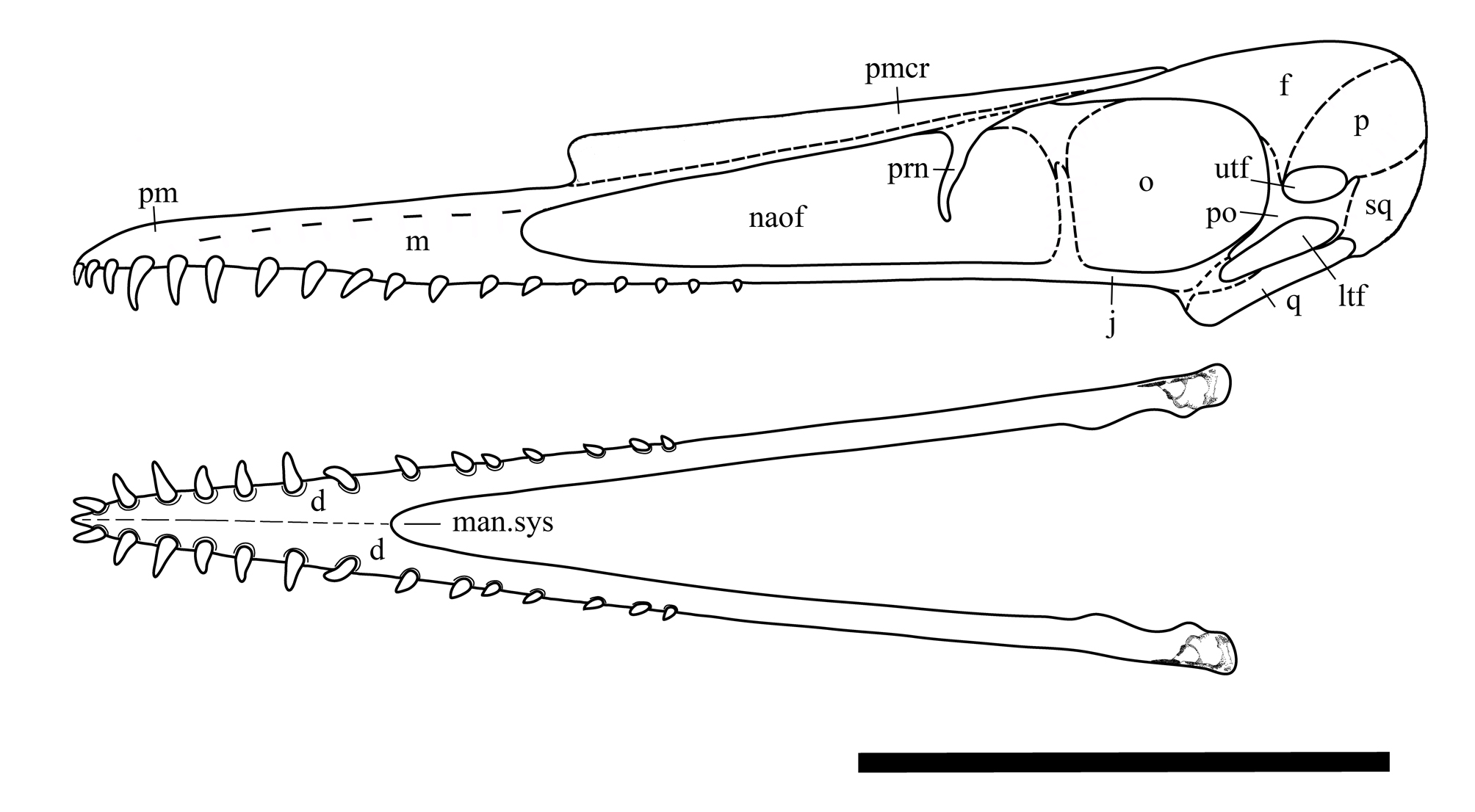
Advanced monofenestratan pterosaurs, such as Darwinopterus had large skulls with a singular large fenestra

In some cases, fossilized keratinous beak tissue has been preserved, though in toothed forms, the beak is small and restricted to the jaw tips and does not involve the teeth. Some advanced beaked forms were toothless, such as the Pteranodontidae and Azhdarchidae, and had larger, more extensive, and more bird-like beaks. Some groups had specialised tooth forms. The Istiodactylidae had recurved teeth for eating meat. Ctenochasmatidae used combs of numerous needle-like teeth for filter feeding; Pterodaustro could have over a thousand bristle-like teeth. Dsungaripteridae covered their teeth with jawbone tissue for a crushing function. If teeth were present, they were placed in separate tooth sockets. Replacement teeth were generated behind, not below, the older teeth.

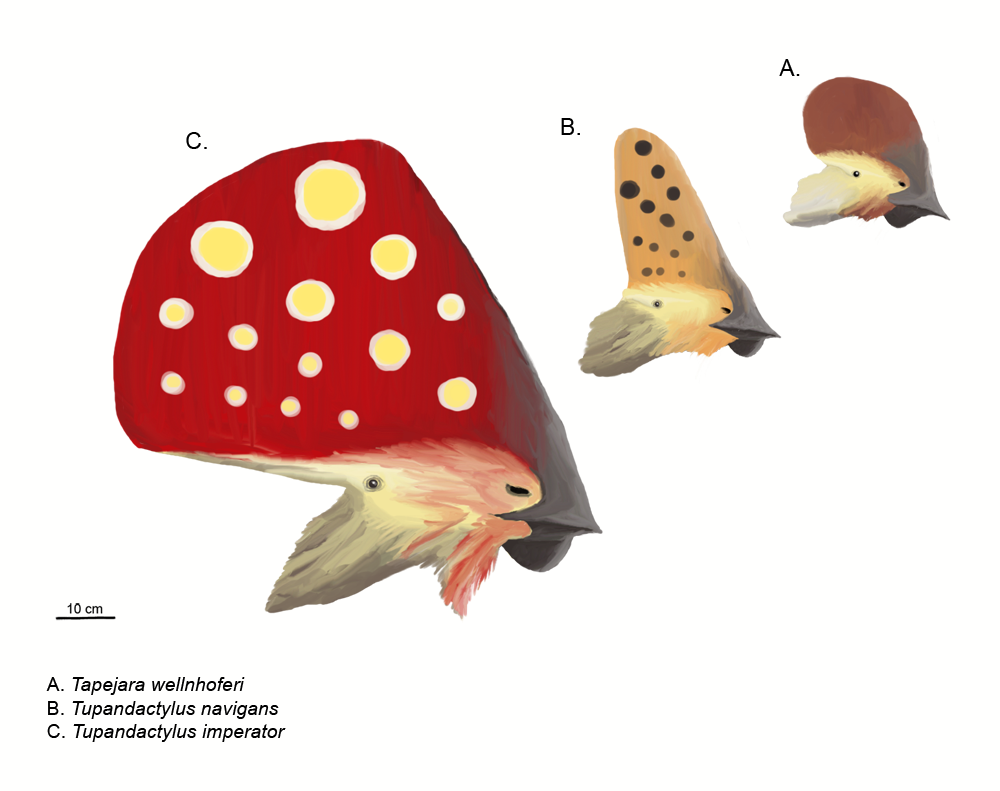
Many pterosaurs, such as these tapejarids, possessed prominent head crests

The public image of pterosaurs is defined by their elaborate head crests. This was influenced by the distinctive backward-pointing crest of the well-known Pteranodon. The main positions of such crests are the front of the snout, as an outgrowth of the premaxillae, or the rear of the skull as an extension of the parietal bones in which case it is called a "supraoccipital crest". Front and rear crests can be present simultaneously and might be fused into a single larger structure, the most expansive of which is shown by the Tapejaridae. Nyctosaurus sported a bizarre antler-like crest. The crests were only a few millimetres thin transversely. The bony crest base would typically be extended by keratinous or other soft tissue.

Since the 1990s, new discoveries and a more thorough study of old specimens have shown that crests are far more widespread among pterosaurs than previously assumed. That they were extended by or composed completely of keratin, which does not fossilize easily, had misled earlier research. For Pterorhynchus and Pterodactylus, the true extent of these crests has only been uncovered using ultraviolet photography. While fossil crests used to be restricted to the more advanced Pterodactyloidea, Pterorhynchus and Austriadactylus show that even some early pterosaurs possessed them.

Like the upper jaws, the paired lower jaws of pterosaurs were very elongated. In advanced forms, they tended to be shorter than the upper cranium because the jaw joint was in a more forward position. The front lower jaw bones, the dentaries or ossa dentalia, were at the tip tightly fused into a central symphysis. This made the lower jaws function as a single connected whole, the mandible. The symphysis was often very thin transversely and long, accounting for a considerable part of the jaw length, up to 60%. If a crest was present on the snout, the symphysis could feature a matching mandible crest, jutting out to below. Toothed species also bore teeth in their dentaries. The mandible opened and closed in a simple vertical or "orthal" up-and-down movement.

== Vertebral column ==
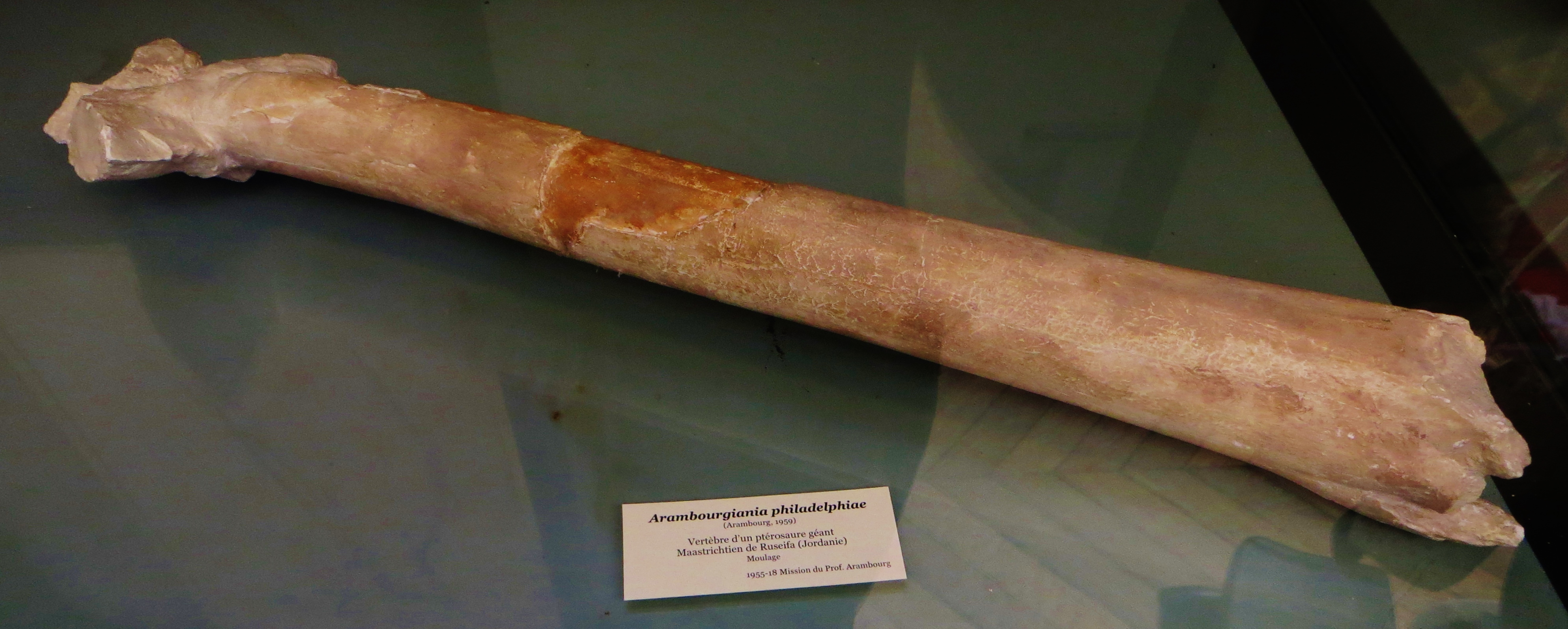
Elongate neck vertebra of the azhdarchid pterosaur Arambourgiania

The vertebral column of pterosaurs numbered between thirty-four and seventy vertebrae. The vertebrae in front of the tail were "procoelous": the cotyle (front of the vertebral body) was concave and into it fitted a convex extension at the rear of the preceding vertebra, the condyle. Advanced pterosaurs are unique in possessing special processes projecting adjacent to their condyle and cotyle, the exapophyses, and the cotyle also may possess a small prong on its midline called a hypapophysis.

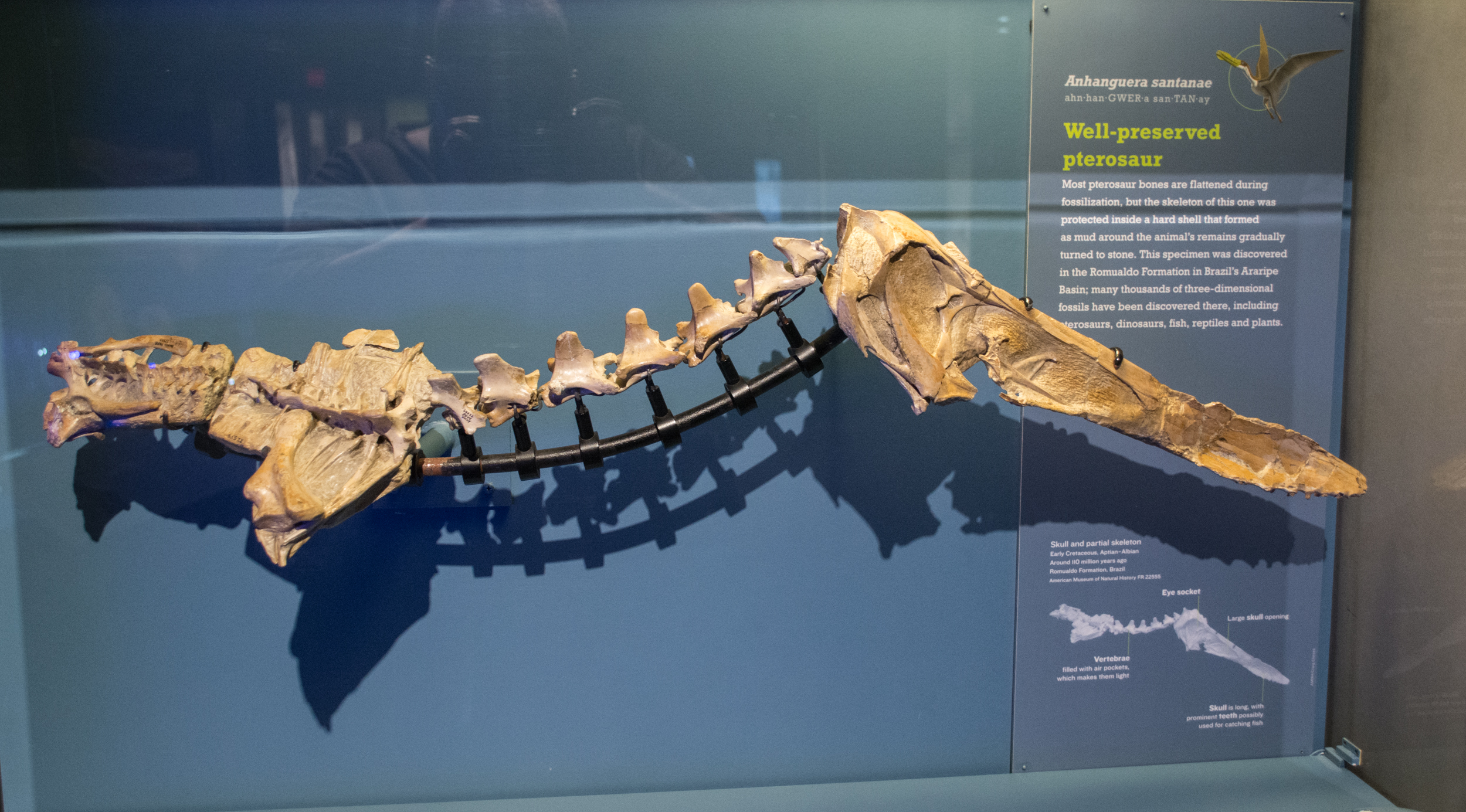
The neck of Anhanguera was longer than the torso

The necks of pterosaurs were relatively long and straight. In pterodactyloids, the neck is typically longer than the torso. This length is not caused by an increase of the number of vertebrae, which is invariably seven. Some researchers include two transitional "cervicodorsals" which brings the number to nine. Instead, the vertebrae themselves became more elongated, up to eight times longer than wide. Nevertheless, the cervicals were wider than high, implying a better vertical than horizontal neck mobility. Pterodactyloids have lost all neck ribs. Pterosaur necks were probably rather thick and well-muscled, especially vertically.

The torso was relatively short and egg-shaped. The vertebrae in the back of pterosaurs originally might have numbered eighteen. With advanced species a growing number of these tended to be incorporated into the sacrum. Such species also often show a fusion of the front dorsal vertebrae into a rigid whole which is called the notarium after a comparable structure in birds. This was an adaptation to withstand the forces caused by flapping the wings. The notarium included three to seven vertebrae, depending on the species involved but also on individual age. These vertebrae could be connected by tendons or a fusion of their neural spines into a "supraneural plate". Their ribs also would be tightly fused into the notarium. In general, the ribs are double headed. The sacrum consisted of three to ten sacral vertebrae. They too, could be connected via a supraneural plate that, however, would not contact the notarium.

The tails of pterosaurs were always rather slender. This means that the caudofemoralis retractor muscle which in most basal Archosauria provides the main propulsive force for the hindlimb, was relatively unimportant. The tail vertebrae were amphicoelous, the vertebral bodies on both ends being concave. Early species had long tails, containing up to fifty caudal vertebrae, the middle ones stiffened by elongated articulation processes, the zygapophyses, and chevrons. Such tails acted as rudders, sometimes ending at the rear in a vertical diamond-shaped or oval vane. In pterodactyloids, the tails were much reduced and never stiffened, with some species counting as few as ten vertebrae.

=== Exapophyses ===
Exapophyses (singular: Exapophysis) are bony joints present in the cervicals (neck vertebrae) of some pterosaurs. Exapophyses lie on the centrum, the spool-shaped main body of each vertebra, where they are positioned adjacent to the main articulating surfaces between centra. Exapophyses which are next to the cotyle (concave front end of the centrum) are known as preexapophyses while those at the condyle (convex rear end) are called postexapophyses. Exapophyses act as accessory articulations, meaning that they complement the cotyle and condyle, as well as the zygapophyses (plate-like joints which lie on the neural arch above the centrum). The term was coined by Samuel Wendell Williston in 1897 during a description of Pteranodon (which he called "Ornithostoma" at the time). Exapophyses are a defining trait of the pterosaur group Eupterodactyloidea, although they are also known to occur in some ctenochasmatids. Rhamphorhynchids have paired, knob-like extensions on the condyle which are occasionally also termed exapophyses, but these extensions are not distinctly offset and are not considered homologous to the exapophyses of eupterodactyloids and ctenochasmatids.

== Shoulder girdle ==
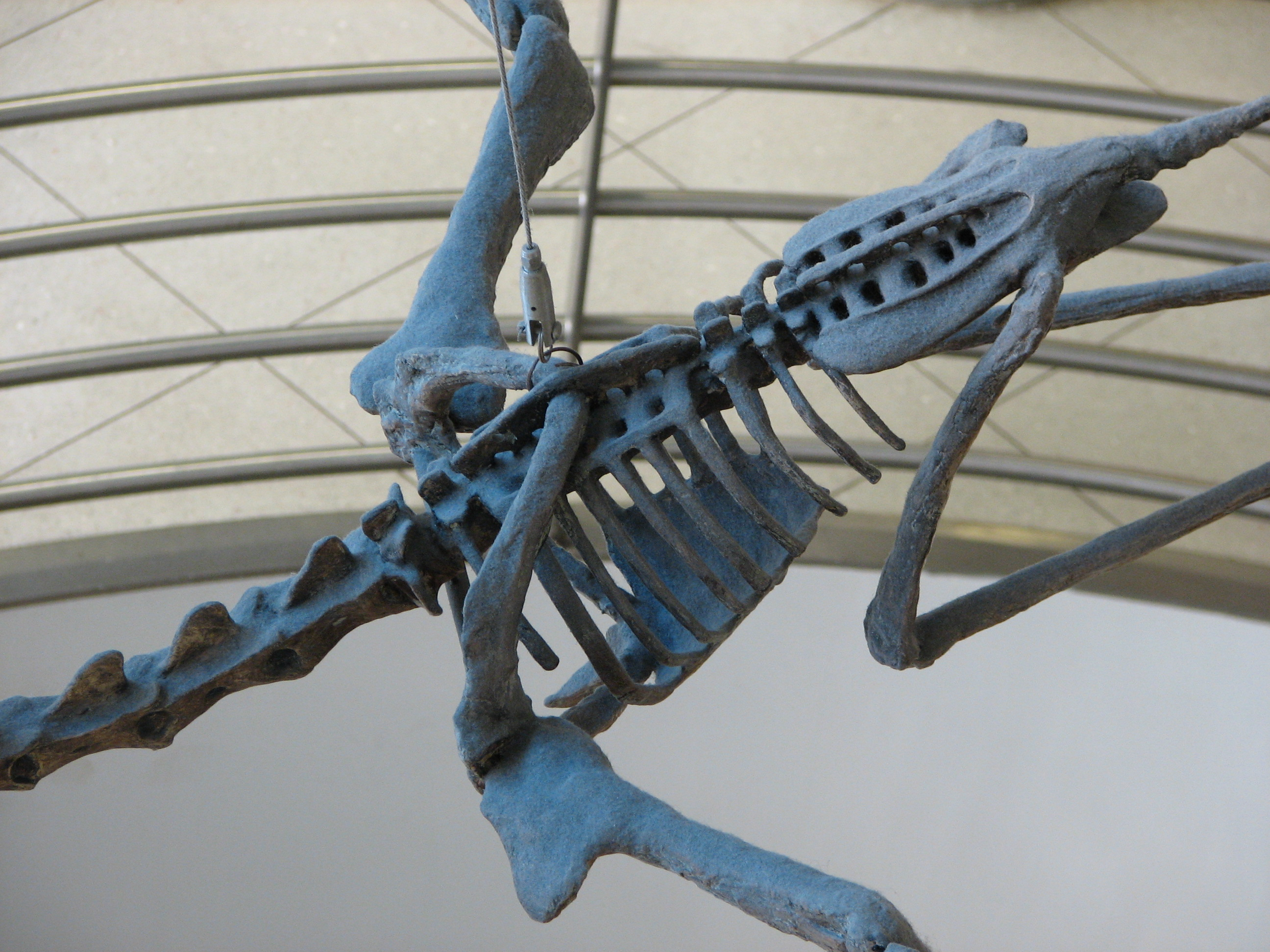
The shoulder girdle connected to the notarium

The shoulder girdle was a strong structure that transferred the forces of flapping flight to the thorax. It was probably covered by thick muscle layers. The upper bone, the shoulder blade, was a straight bar. It was connected to a lower bone, the coracoid that is relatively long in pterosaurs. In advanced species, their combined whole, the scapulocoracoid, was almost vertically oriented. The shoulder blade in that case fitted into a recess in the side of the notarium, while the coracoid likewise connected to the breastbone. This way, both sides together made for a rigid closed loop, able to withstand considerable forces. A peculiarity was that the breastbone connections of the coracoids often were asymmetrical, with one coracoid attached in front of the other. In advanced species the shoulder joint had moved from the shoulder blade to the coracoid. The joint was saddle-shaped and allowed considerable movement to the wing. It faced sideways and somewhat upwards.

The breastbone, formed by fused paired sterna, was wide. It had only a shallow keel. Via sternal ribs, it was at its sides attached to the dorsal ribs. At its rear, a row of belly ribs or gastralia was present, covering the entire belly. To the front, a long point, the cristospina, jutted obliquely upwards. The rear edge of the breastbone was the deepest point of the thorax. Clavicles or interclavicles were completely absent.

== Wings ==
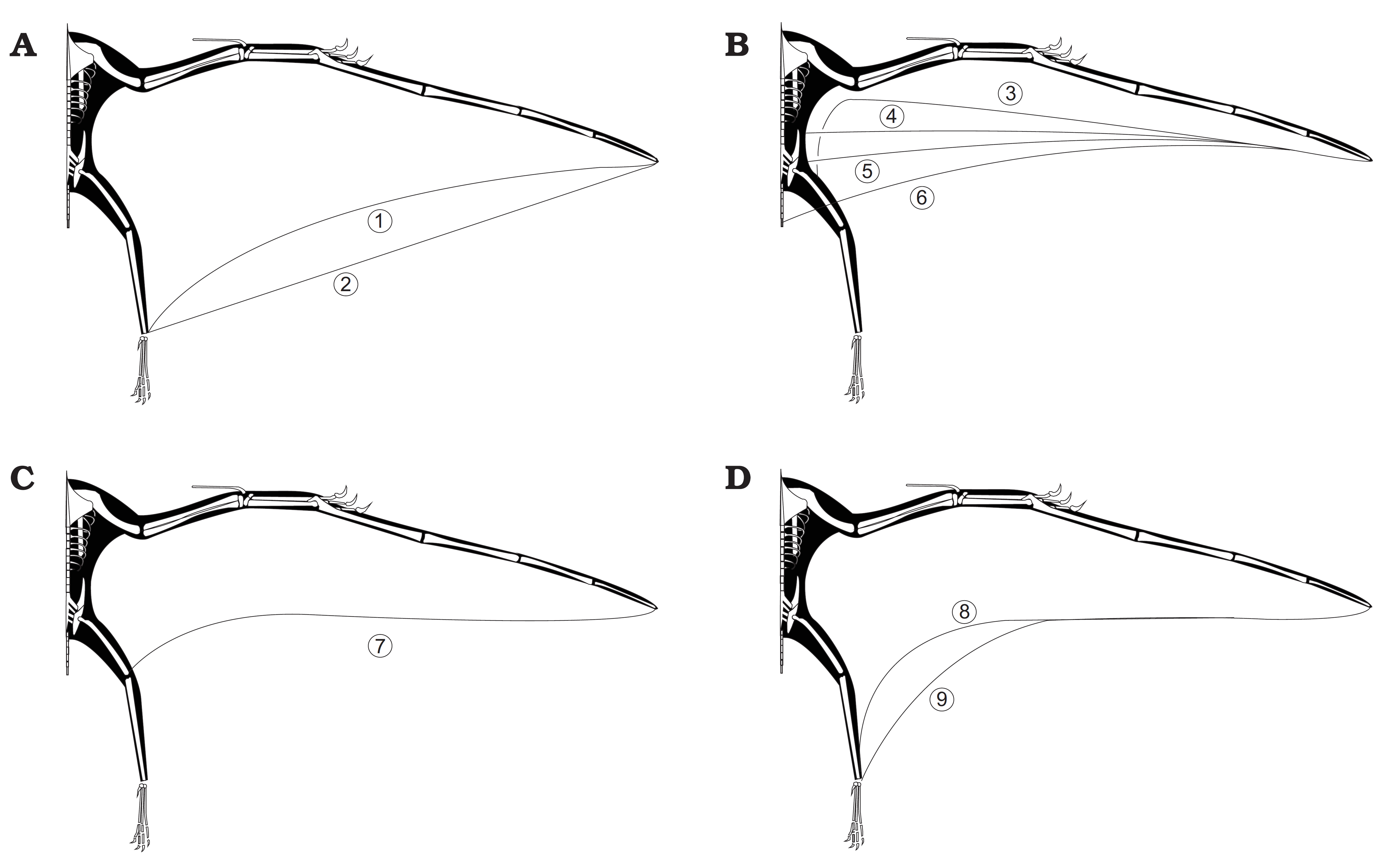
Various configurations proposed for the wings of pterosaurs

Pterosaur wings were formed by bones and membranes of skin and other tissues. The primary membranes attached to the extremely long fourth finger of each arm and extended along the sides of the body. Where they ended has been very controversial but since the 1990s a dozen specimens with preserved soft tissue have been found that seem to show they attached to the ankles. The exact curvature of the trailing edge, however, is still equivocal.

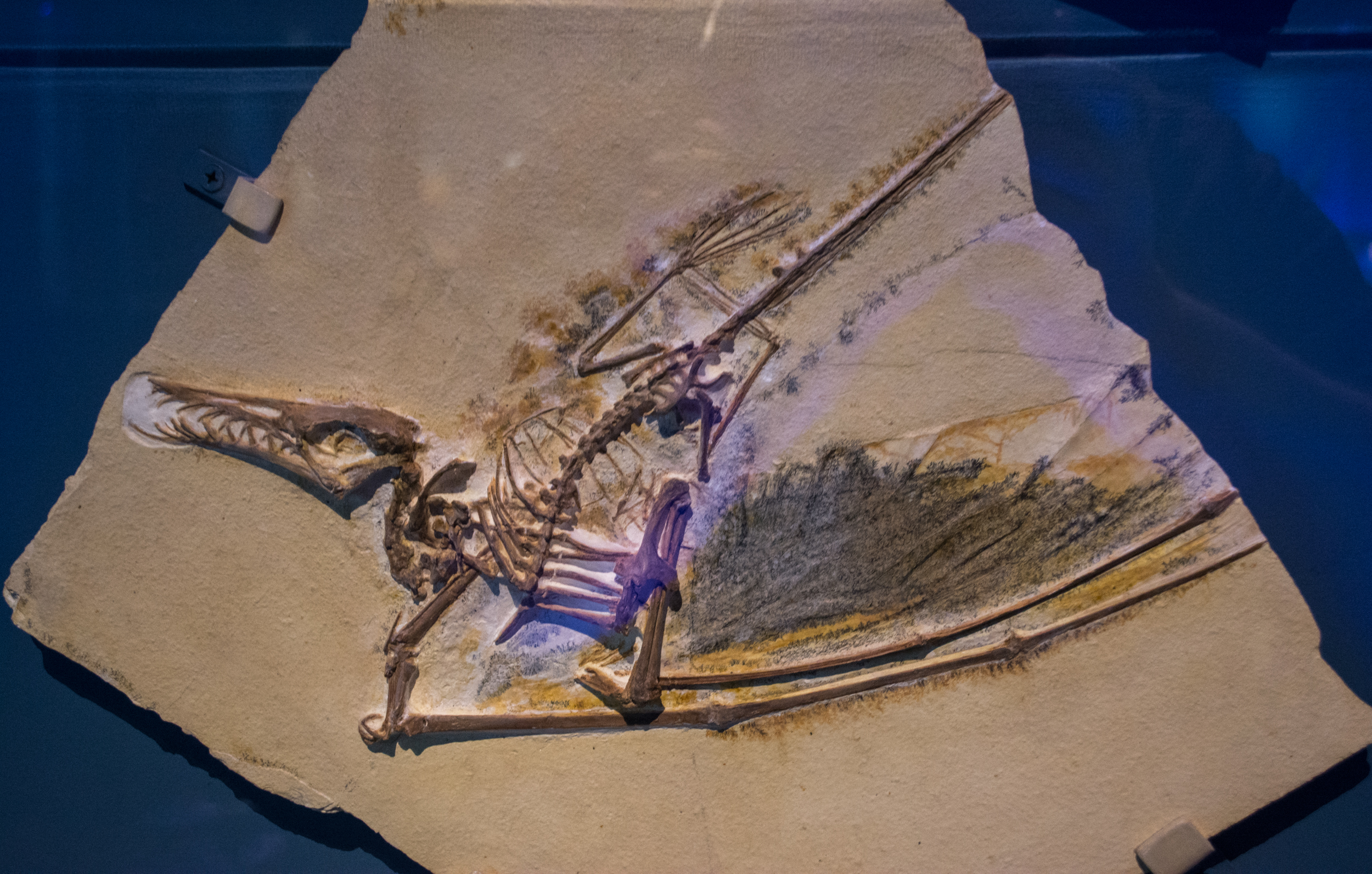
Some specimens, such as this Rhamphorhynchus, preserve the membrane structure

While historically thought of as simple leathery structures composed of skin, research has since shown that the wing membranes of pterosaurs were highly complex dynamic structures suited to an active style of flight. The outer wings (from the tip to the elbow) were strengthened by closely spaced fibers called actinofibrils. The actinofibrils themselves consisted of three distinct layers in the wing, forming a crisscross pattern when superimposed on one another. The function of the actinofibrils is unknown, as is the exact material from which they were made. Depending on their exact composition (keratin, muscle, elastic structures, etc.), they may have been stiffening or strengthening agents in the outer part of the wing. The wing membranes also contained a thin layer of muscle, fibrous tissue, and a unique, complex circulatory system of looping blood vessels. The combination of actinofibrils and muscle layers may have allowed the animal to adjust the wing slackness and camber.

As shown by cavities in the wing bones of larger species and soft tissue preserved in at least one specimen, some pterosaurs extended their system of respiratory air sacs into the wing membrane.

=== Parts of the wing ===
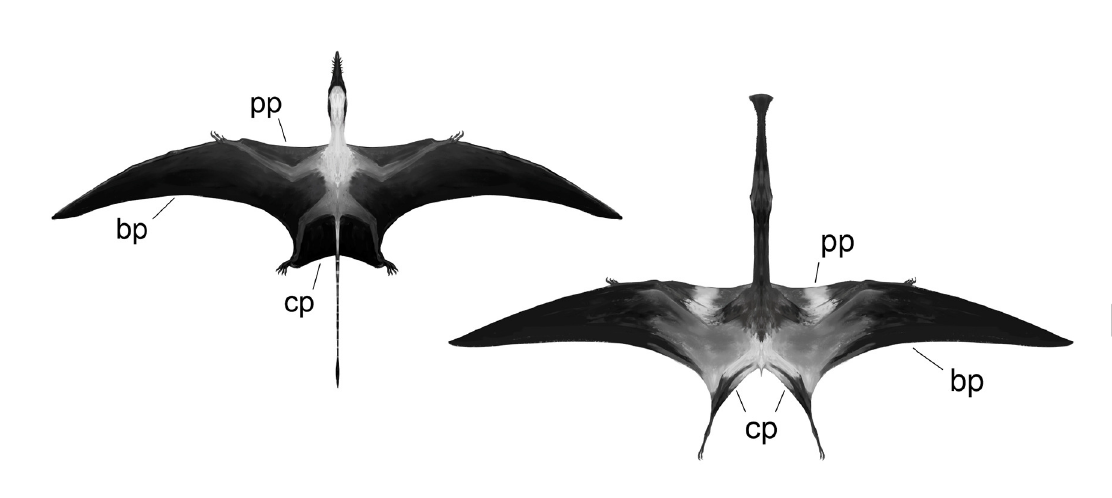
Two pterosaurs (Scaphognathus and Balaenognathus) in dorsal view, with wing parts labeled (bp: brachiopatagium, cp: cruropatagium, pp: propatagium)

The pterosaur wing membrane is divided into three basic units. The first, called the propatagium ("fore membrane"), was the forward-most part of the wing and attached between the wrist and shoulder, creating the "leading edge" during flight. The brachiopatagium ("arm membrane") was the primary component of the wing, stretching from the highly elongated fourth finger of the hand to the hindlimbs. Finally, at least some pterosaur groups had a membrane that stretched between the legs, possibly connecting to or incorporating the tail, called the uropatagium; the extent of this membrane is not certain, as studies on Sordes seem to suggest that it simply connected the legs but did not involve the tail (rendering it a cruropatagium). A common interpretation is that non-pterodactyloid pterosaurs had a broader uro/cruropatagium stretched between their long fifth toes, with pterodactyloids, lacking such toes, only having membranes running along the legs.

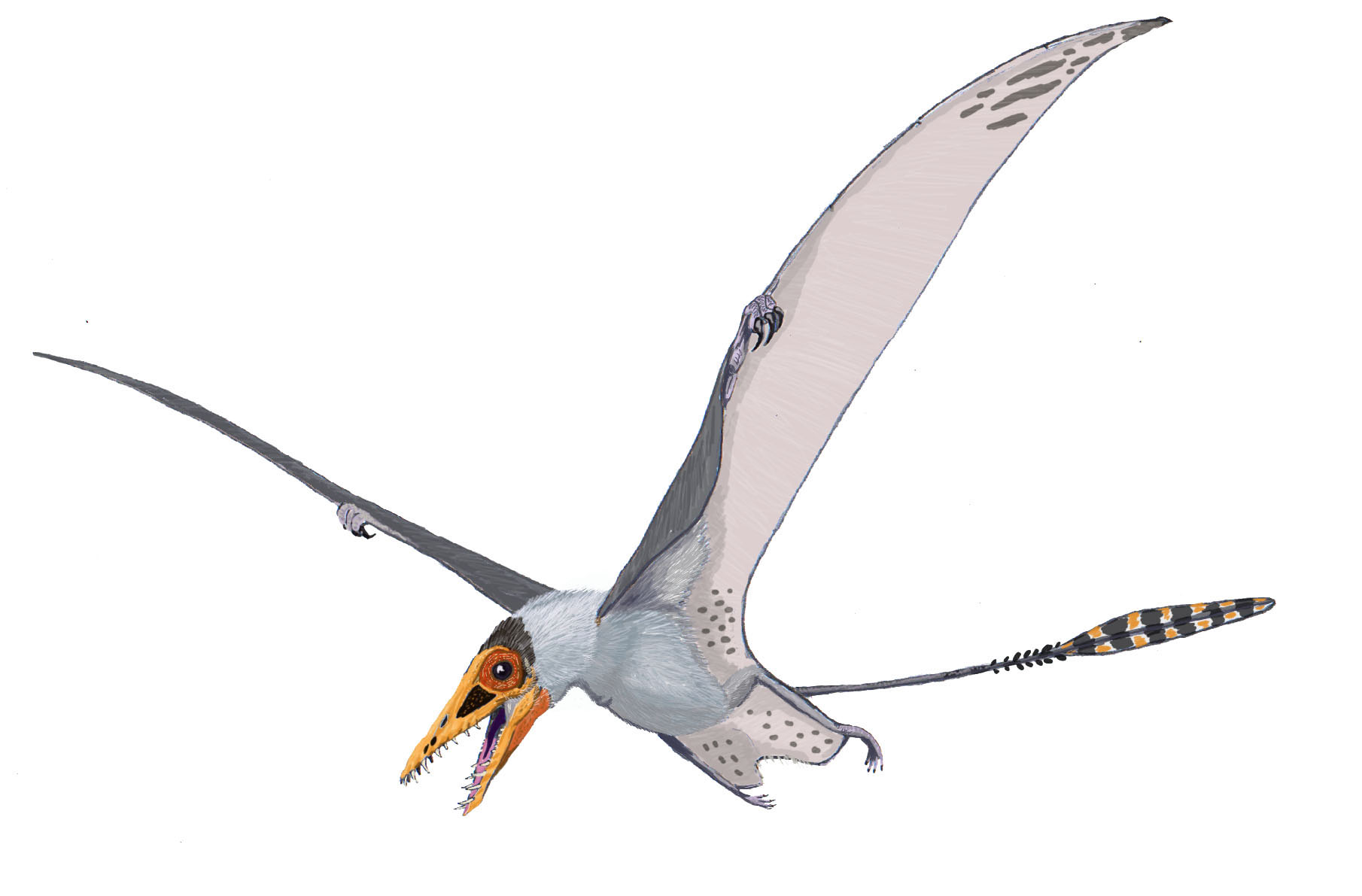
Sordes, as depicted here, evidences the possibility that pterosaurs had a cruropatagium – a membrane connecting the legs that, unlike the chiropteran uropatagium, leaves the tail free

There has been considerable argument among paleontologists about whether the main wing membranes (brachiopatagia) attached to the hindlimbs, and if so, where. Fossils of the rhamphorhynchoid Sordes, the anurognathid Jeholopterus, and a pterodactyloid from the Santana Formation seem to demonstrate that the wing membrane did attach to the hindlimbs, at least in some species. However, modern bats and flying squirrels show considerable variation in the extent of their wing membranes and it is possible that, like these groups, different species of pterosaur had different wing designs. Indeed, analysis of pterosaur limb proportions shows that there was considerable variation, possibly reflecting a variety of wing-plans.

The bony elements of the arm formed a mechanism to support and extend the wing. Near the body, the humerus or upper arm bone is short but powerfully built. It sports a large deltopectoral crest, to which the major flight muscles are attached. Despite the considerable forces exerted on it, the humerus is hollow or pneumatised inside, reinforced by bone struts. The long bones of the lower arm, the ulna and radius, are much longer than the humerus. They were probably incapable of pronation.

A bone unique to pterosaurs, known as the pteroid, connected to the wrist and helped to support the forward membrane (the propatagium) between the wrist and shoulder. Evidence of webbing between the three free fingers of the pterosaur forelimb suggests that this forward membrane may have been more extensive than the simple pteroid-to-shoulder connection traditionally depicted in life restorations. The position of the pteroid bone itself has been controversial. Some scientists, notably Matthew Wilkinson, have argued that the pteroid pointed forward, extending the forward membrane and allowing it to function as an adjustable flap. This view was contradicted in a 2007 paper by Chris Bennett, who showed that the pteroid did not articulate as previously thought and could not have pointed forward, but rather was directed inward toward the body as traditionally interpreted. Specimens of Changchengopterus pani and Darwinopterus linglongtaensis show the pteroid in articulation with the proximal syncarpal, suggesting that the pteroid articulated with the 'saddle' of the radiale (proximal syncarpal) and that both the pteroid and preaxial carpal were migrated centralia.

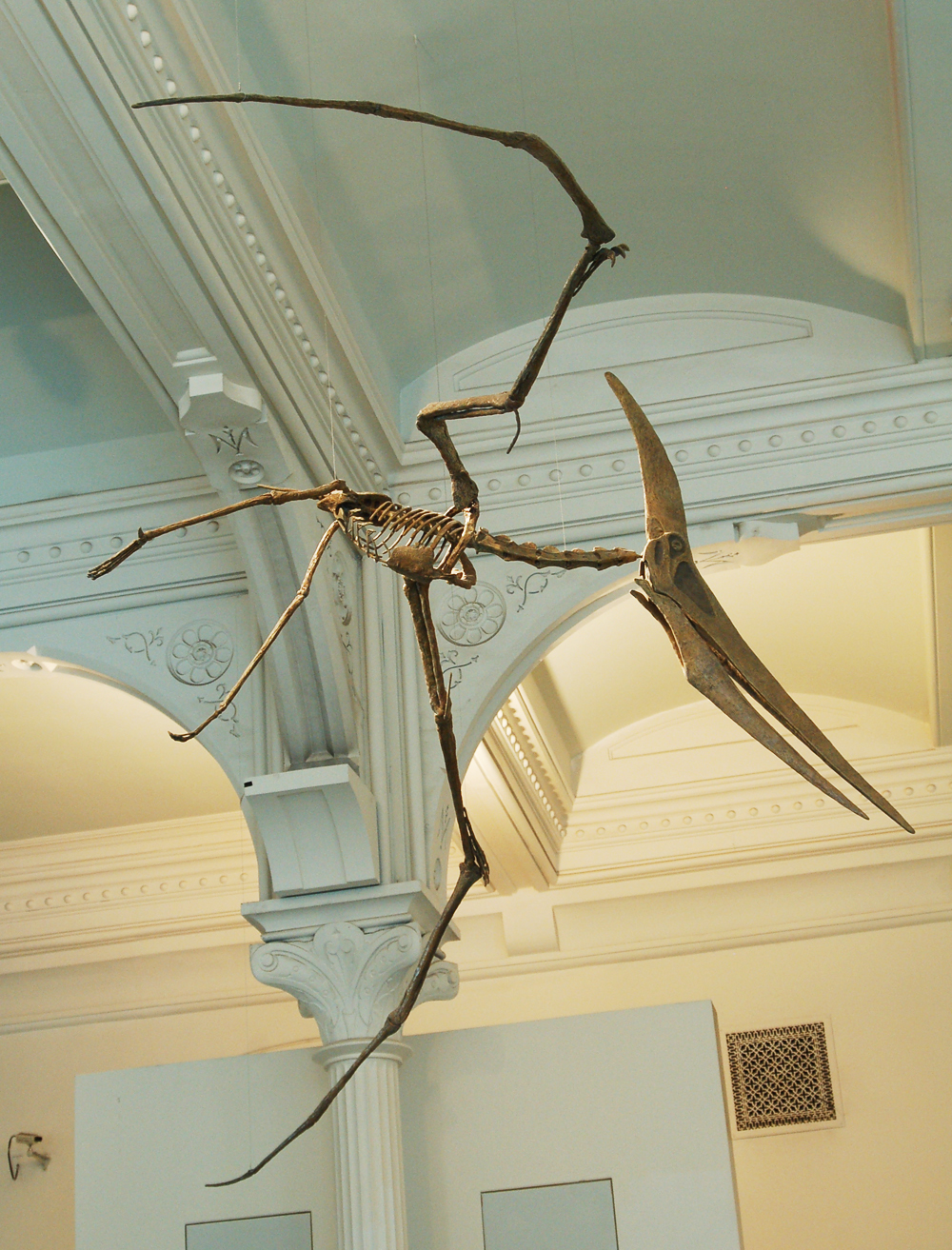
Some advanced pterosaurs such as Pteranodon had highly elongate wings

The pterosaur wrist consists of two inner (proximal, at the side of the long bones of the arm) and four outer (distal, at the side of the hand) carpals (wrist bones), excluding the pteroid bone, which may itself be a modified distal carpal. The proximal carpals are fused together into a "syncarpal" in mature specimens, while three of the distal carpals fuse to form a distal syncarpal. The remaining distal carpal, referred to here as the medial carpal, but which has also been termed the distal lateral, or pre-axial carpal, articulates on a vertically elongate biconvex facet on the anterior surface of the distal syncarpal. The medial carpal bears a deep concave fovea that opens anteriorly, ventrally and somewhat medially, within which the pteroid articulates, according to Wilkinson.

In derived pterodactyloids like pteranodontians and azhdarchoids, metacarpals I-III are small and do not connect to the carpus, instead hanging in contact with the fourth metacarpal. With these derived species, the fourth metacarpal has been enormously elongated, typically equalling or exceeding the length of the long bones of the lower arm. The fifth metacarpal had been lost. In all species, the first to third fingers are much smaller than the fourth, the "wingfinger", and contain two, three and four phalanges respectively. The smaller fingers are clawed, with the ungual size varying among species. In nyctosaurids the forelimb digits besides the wingfinger have been lost altogether. The wingfinger accounts for about half or more of the total wing length. It normally consists of four phalanges. Their relative lengths tend to vary among species, which has often been used to distinguish related forms. The fourth phalanx is usually the shortest. It lacks a claw and has been lost completely by nyctosaurids. It is curved to behind, resulting in a rounded wing tip, which reduces induced drag. The wingfinger is also bent somewhat downwards.

When standing, pterosaurs probably rested on their metacarpals, with the outer wing folded to behind. In this position, the "anterior" sides of the metacarpals were rotated to the rear. This would point the smaller fingers obliquely to behind. According to Bennett, this would imply that the wingfinger, able to describe the largest arc of any wing element, up to 175°, was not folded by flexion but by an extreme extension. The wing was automatically folded when the elbow was bowed.

A laser-simulated fluorescence scan on Pterodactylus also identified a membranous "fairing" (area conjunctioning the wing with the body at the neck), as opposed to the feathered or fur-composed "fairing" seen in birds and bats respectively.

== Pelvis ==
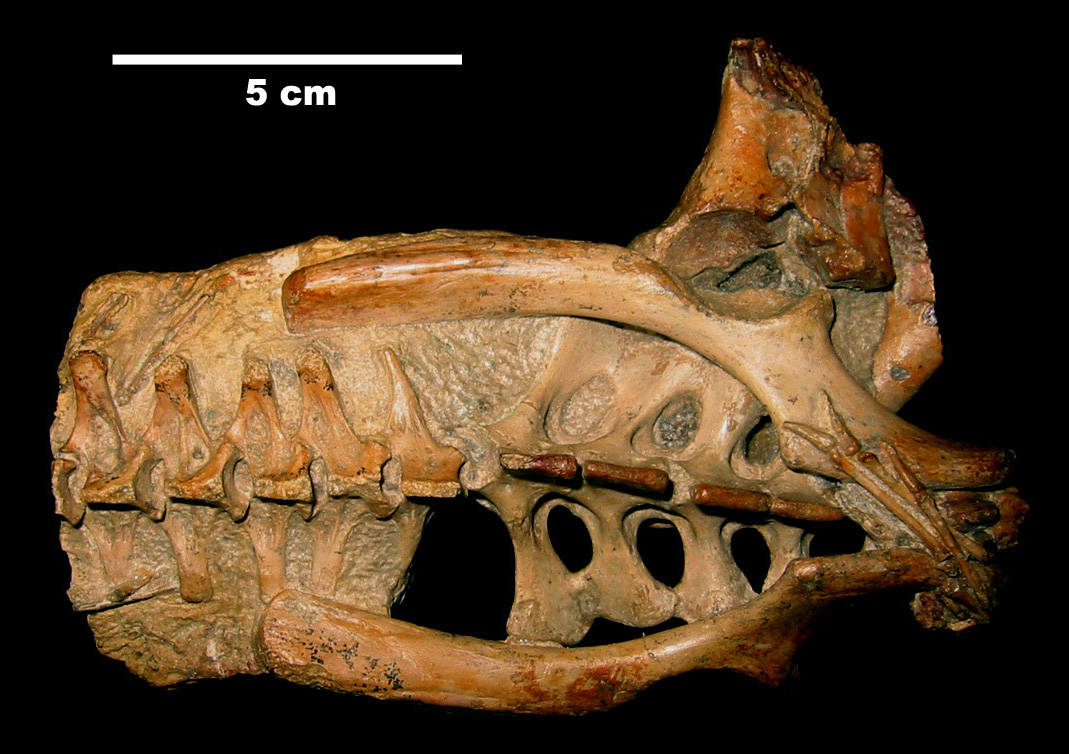
An anhanguerid pelvis seen from above, with the right side rotated towards the viewer

The pelvis of pterosaurs was of moderate size compared to the body as a whole. Often the three pelvic bones were fused. The ilium was long and low, its front and rear blades projecting horizontally beyond the edges of the lower pelvic bones. Despite this length, the rod-like form of these processes indicates that the hindlimb muscles attached to them were limited in strength. The, in side view narrow, pubic bone fused with the broad ischium into an ischiopubic blade. Sometimes, the blades of both sides were also fused, closing the pelvis from below and forming the pelvic canal. The hip joint was not perforated and allowed considerable mobility to the leg. It was directed obliquely upwards, preventing a perfectly vertical position of the leg.

The front of the pubic bones articulated with a unique structure, the paired prepubic bones. Together these formed a cusp covering the rear belly, between the pelvis and the belly ribs. The vertical mobility of this element suggests a function in breathing, compensating the relative rigidity of the chest cavity.

== Hindlimbs ==
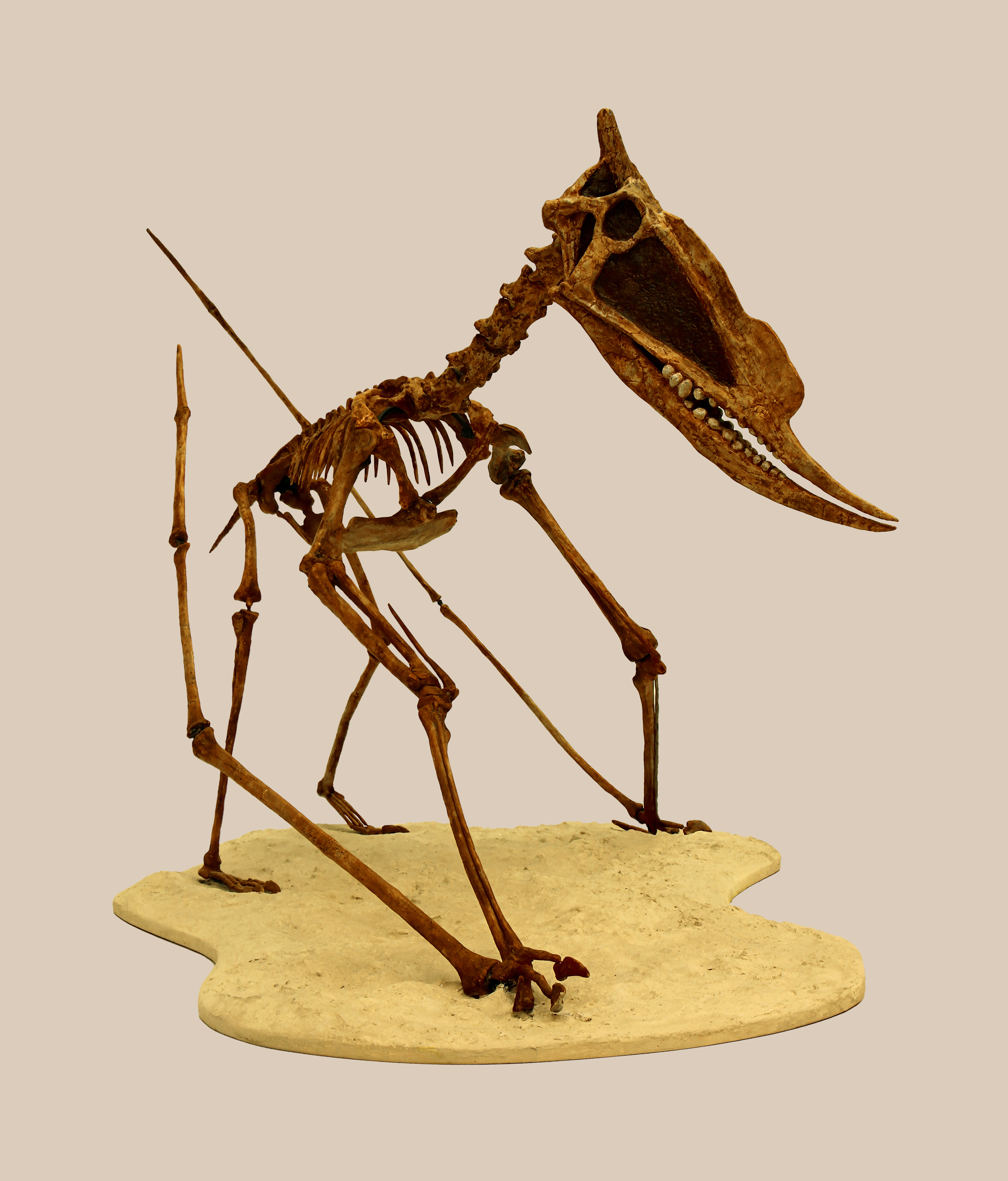
Some pterosaurs such as Dsungaripterus had developed hindlimbs, and were likely highly capable walkers and runners

The hindlimbs of pterosaurs were strongly built, yet relative to their wingspans smaller than those of birds. They were long in comparison to the torso length. The thighbone was rather straight, with the head making only a small angle with the shaft. This implies that the legs were not held vertically below the body but were somewhat sprawling. The shinbone was often fused with the upper ankle bones into a tibiotarsus that was longer than the thighbone. It could attain a vertical position when walking. The calf bone tended to be slender, especially at its lower end that in advanced forms did not reach the ankle, sometimes reducing total length to a third. Typically, it was fused to the shinbone. The ankle was a simple, "mesotarsal", hinge. The, rather long and slender, metatarsus was always splayed to some degree. The foot was plantigrade, meaning that during the walking cycle the sole of the metatarsus was pressed onto the soil.

There was a clear difference between early pterosaurs and advanced species regarding the form of the fifth digit. Originally, the fifth metatarsal was robust and not very shortened. It was connected to the ankle in a higher position than the other metatarsals. It bore a long, and often curved, mobile clawless fifth toe consisting of two phalanges. The function of this element has been enigmatic. It used to be thought that the animals slept upside-down like bats, hanging from branches and using the fifth toes as hooks. Another hypothesis held that they stretched the brachiopatagia, but in articulated fossils the fifth digits are always flexed towards the tail. Later it became popular to assume that these toes extended an uropatagium or cruropatagium between them. As the fifth toes were on the outside of the feet, such a configuration would only have been possible if these rotated their fronts outwards in flight. Such a rotation could be caused by an abduction of the thighbone, meaning that the legs would be spread. This would also turn the feet into a vertical position. They then could act as rudders to control yaw. Some specimens show membranes between the toes, allowing them to function as flight control surfaces. The uropatagium or cruropatagium would control pitch. When walking the toes could flex upwards to lift the membrane from the ground. In Pterodactyloidea, the fifth metatarsal was much reduced and the fifth toe, if present, little more than a stub. This suggests that their membranes were split, increasing flight maneuverability.

The first to fourth toes were long. They had two, three, four and five phalanges respectively. Often the third toe was longest; sometimes the fourth. Flat joints indicate a limited mobility. These toes were clawed but the claws were smaller than the hand claws.

== Soft tissues ==
The rare conditions that allowed for the fossilisation of pterosaur remains, sometimes also preserved soft tissues. Modern synchrotron or ultraviolet light photography has revealed many traces not visible to the naked eye. These are often imprecisely called "impressions" but mostly consist of petrifications, natural casts and transformations of the original material. They may include horn crests, beaks or claw sheaths as well as the various flight membranes. Exceptionally, muscles were preserved. Skin patches show small round non-overlapping scales on the soles of the feet, the ankles and the ends of the metatarsals. They covered pads cushioning the impact of walking. Scales are unknown from other parts of the body.

=== Pycnofibers ===
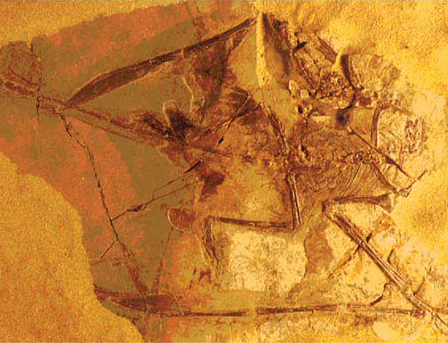
Sordes preserved pycnofibers

Most or all pterosaurs had hair-like filaments known as pycnofibers on the head and torso. The term "pycnofiber", meaning "dense filament", was coined by palaeontologist Alexander Kellner and colleagues in 2009. Pycnofibers were unique structures similar to, but not homologous (sharing a common origin) with, mammalian hair, an example of convergent evolution. A fuzzy integument was first reported from a specimen of Scaphognathus crassirostris in 1831 by Georg August Goldfuss, but had been widely doubted. Since the 1990s, pterosaur finds and histological and ultraviolet examination of pterosaur specimens have provided incontrovertible proof: pterosaurs had pycnofiber coats. Sordes pilosus (which translates as "hairy demon") and Jeholopterus ninchengensis show pycnofibers on the head and body.

The presence of pycnofibers strongly indicates that pterosaurs were endothermic (warm-blooded). They aided thermoregulation, as is common in warm-blooded animals who need insulation to prevent excessive heat-loss. Pycnofibers were flexible, short filaments, about five to seven millimetres long and rather simple in structure with a hollow central canal. Pterosaur pelts might have been comparable in density to many Mesozoic mammals. (Note: See the expansion of ecological niches in the Mesozoic)

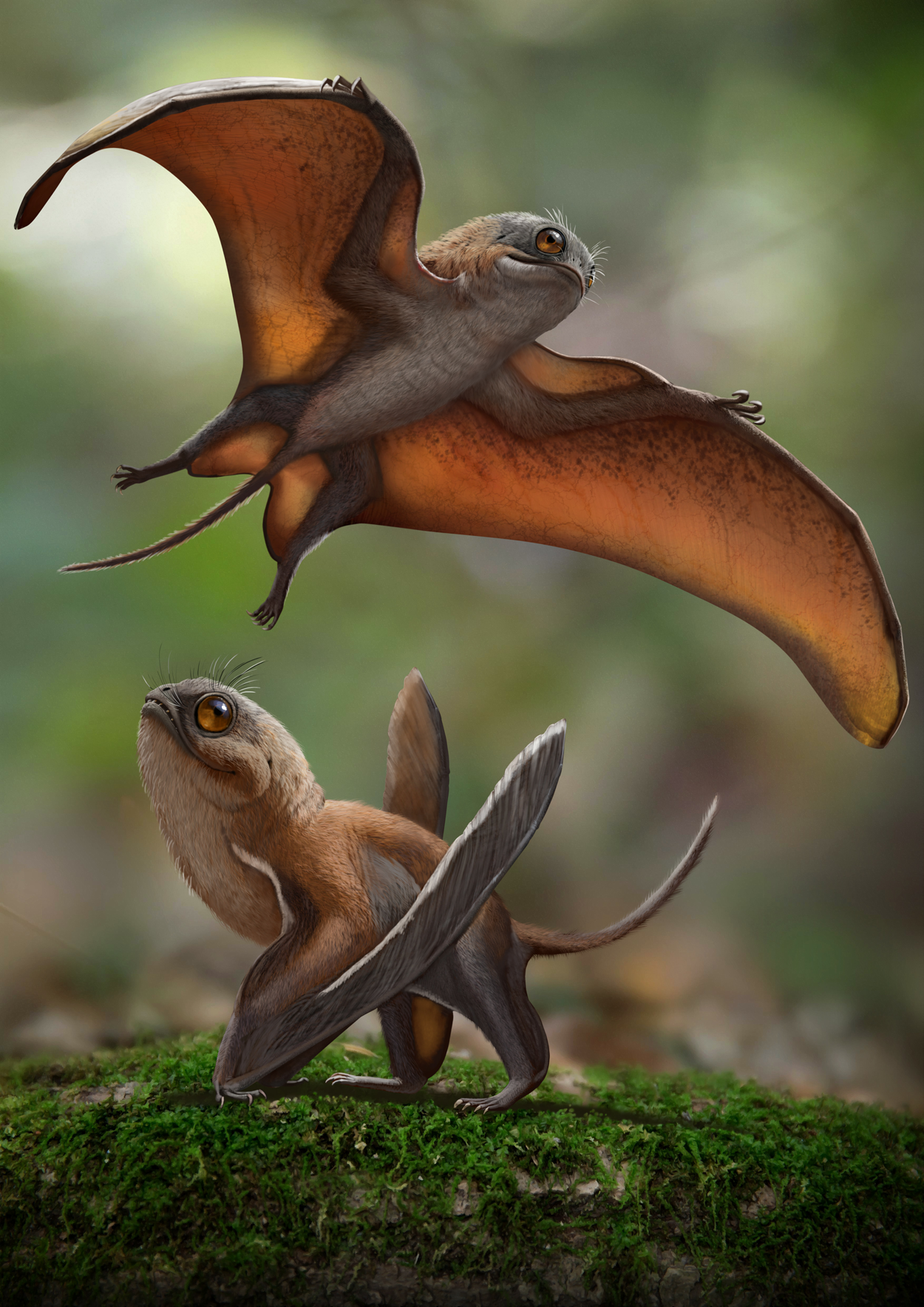
Specimens of anurognathid pterosaurs (Sinomacrops pictured) were the first to indicate complex feather-like structures in pterosaurs

Pterosaur filaments could share a common origin with feathers, as speculated in 2002 by Czerkas and Ji. In 2009, Kellner concluded that pycnofibers were structured similarly to theropod proto-feathers. Others were unconvinced, considering the difference with the "quills" found on many of the bird-like maniraptoran specimens too fundamental.

A 2018 study of the remains of two small Jurassic-age pterosaurs from Inner Mongolia, China, found that pterosaurs had a wide array of pycnofiber shapes and structures, as opposed to the homogeneous structures that had generally been assumed to cover them. Some of these had frayed ends, very similar in structure to four different feather types known from birds or other dinosaurs but almost never known from pterosaurs prior to the study, suggesting homology. A response to this study was published in 2020, where it was suggested that the structures seen on the anurognathids were actually a result of the decomposition of aktinofibrils: a type of fibre used to strengthen and stiffen the wing. However, in a response to this, the authors of the 2018 paper point to the fact that the presence of the structures extend past the patagium, and the presence of both aktinofibrils and filaments on Jeholopterus ningchengensis and Sordes pilosus. The various forms of filament structure present on the anurognathids in the 2018 study would also require a form of decomposition that would cause the different 'filament' forms seen. They therefore conclude that the most parsimonious interpretation of the structures is that they are filamentous protofeathers. But Liliana D'Alba points out that the description of the preserved integumentary structures on the two anurognathid specimens is still based upon gross morphology. She also points out that Pterorhynchus was described to have feathers to support the claim that feathers had a common origin with Ornithodirans but was argued against by several authors. The only method to assure if it was homologous to feathers is to use a scanning electron microscope.

In 2022, a new fossil of Tupandactylus cf. imperator was found to have melanosomes in forms that signal an earlier-than-anticipated development of patterns found in extant feathers. The new specimen suggested that pterosaur integumentary melanosomes exhibited a more complex organization than those previously known from other pterosaurs. This indicates the presence of a unique form of melanosomes within pterosaur integument at the time, distinct from previously known contemporary integumentary structures and more similar to those reported from mammalian hair and avian feathers. The feather fossils obtained from this specimen also suggest the presence of Stage IIIa feathers, a new discovery that indicates more complex feather structures were present in pterosaurs. The study describing this specimen further clarifies the timeline of avian feather evolution and suggests that the feather-specific melanosome signaling found in extant birds are possibly homologous with those found in pterosaurs.

== Sources ==
- Wellnhofer, Peter (1991). The Illustrated Encyclopedia of Pterosaurs: An Illustrated Natural History of the Flying Reptiles of the Mesozoic Era. Crescent Books. ISBN 978-0-517-03701-0.
- Witton, Mark (2013). Pterosaurs: Natural History, Evolution, Anatomy. Princeton University Press. ISBN 978-0-691-15061-1.
