= Torleite Formation =

Geologic formation in Germany

- Stratigraphic range: Kimmeridgian; ~155–150 Ma
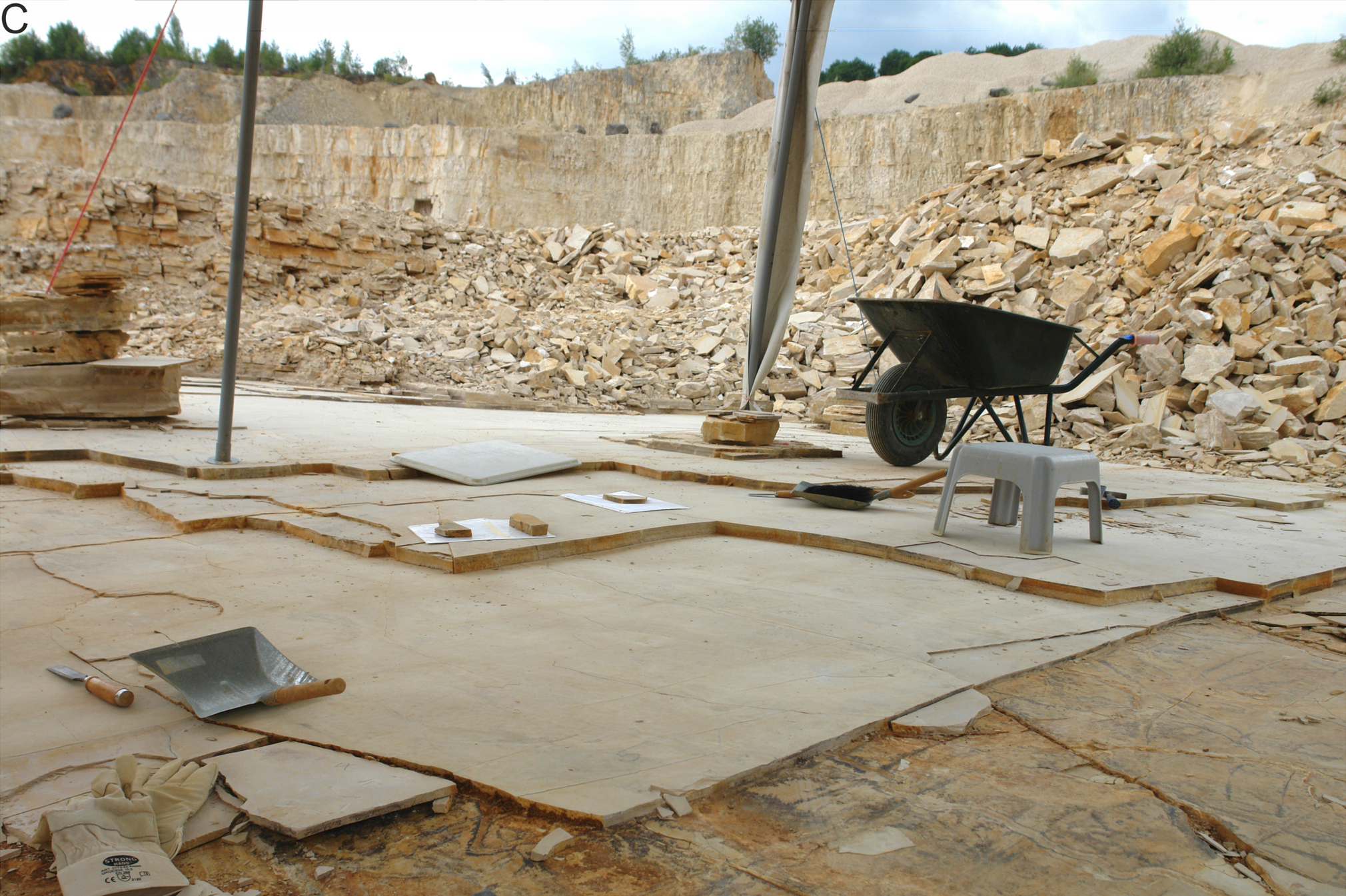
- Outcrop of the Torelite Formation near Wattendorf which is the type locality of Balaenognathus maeuseri
- Type: Formation
- Unit of: Upper Weißjura Group
- Underlies: Rögling & Painten Formations
- Overlies: Treuchtlingen Formation

Lithology
- Primary: Limestone
- Other: Mudstone

Location
- Coordinates: 50.0°N 11.1°E
- Approximate paleocoordinates: 41.2°N 19.2°E
- Region: Bavaria
- Country: Germany
- Torleite Formation (Germany)

The Torleite Formation is a geologic formation and Lagerstätte in Germany. It preserves fossils dating to the Kimmeridgian stage of the Jurassic period. Animals recovered from the formation include the small theropod dinosaur Sciurumimus, the ctenochasmatid pterosaur Balaenognathus, and the extinct bony fish Anaethalion.

== Fossil content ==
The following fossils have been reported from the formation:

=== Crocodylomorphs ===
- Alligatorium franconicum (=Neosuchia indet.)
- Cricosaurus bambergensis
- Dakosaurus maximus
- Cricosaurus sp.

=== Dinosaurs ===
- Juravenator starki
- Sciurumimus albersdoerferi

=== Pterosaurs ===
- Balaenognathus maeuseri

=== Turtles ===
- Eurysternum wagleri

=== Rhynchocephalians ===
- Sphenofontis velserae

=== Fish ===
- Anaethalion sp.
- Leptolepides sp.
- Leptolepis sp.
- Pholidophorus sp.
- Pleuropholis sp.

== See also ==
- List of fossiliferous stratigraphic units in Germany
