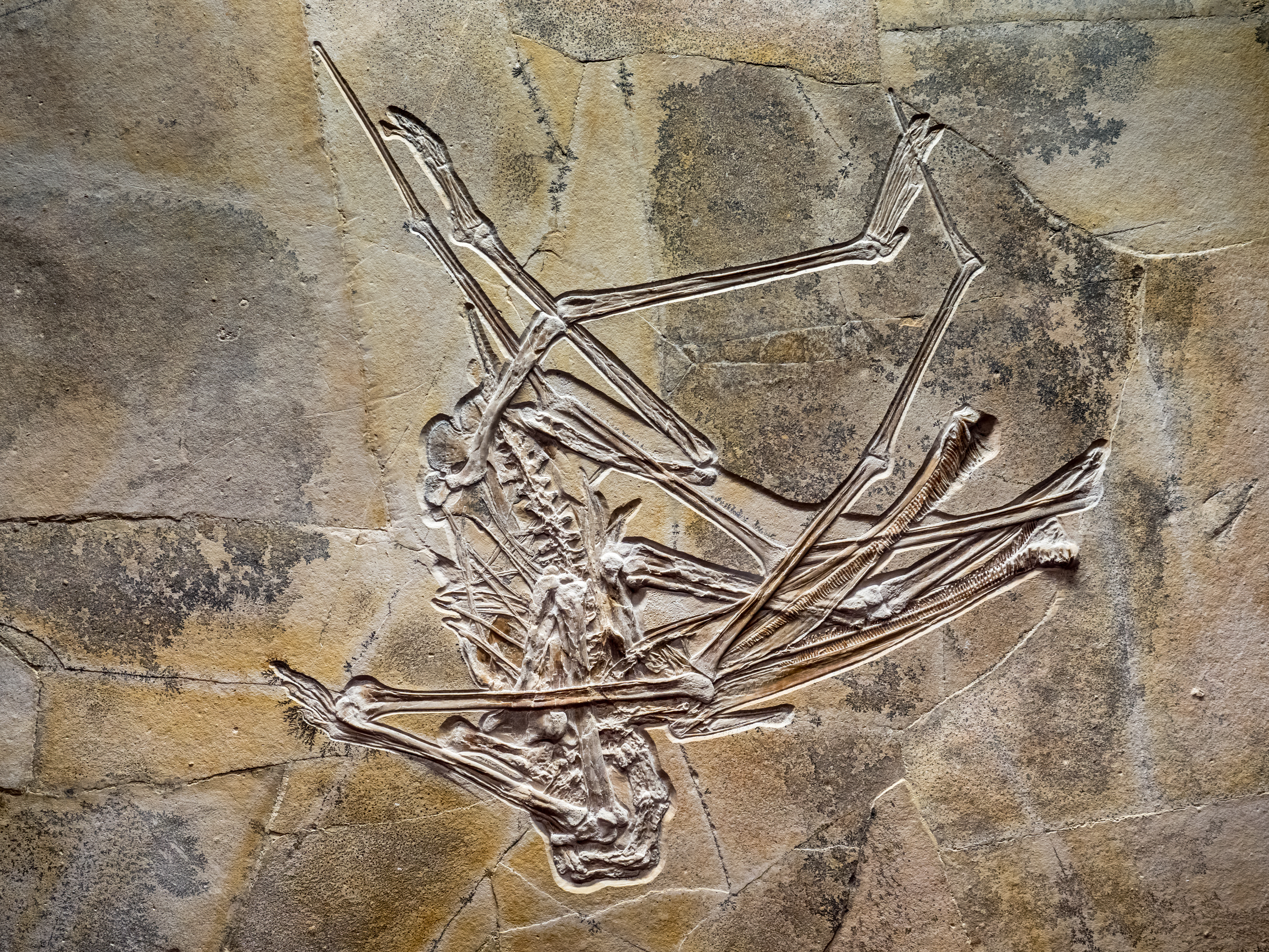
- Holotype specimen

Scientific classification
- Kingdom: Animalia
- Phylum: Chordata
- Class: Reptilia
- Order: †Pterosauria
- Suborder: †Pterodactyloidea
- Family: †Ctenochasmatidae
- Genus: †Balaenognathus; Martill et al., 2023
- Species: †B. maeuseri

Binomial name
- †Balaenognathus maeuseri Martill et al., 2023

= Balaenognathus =

Balaenognathus Temporal range: Late Jurassic, ~157–145 Ma

Extinct genus of ctenochasmatid pterosaurs

Balaenognathus (meaning "bowhead whale jaw") is an extinct genus of ctenochasmatid pterosaurs from the Late Jurassic Torleite Formation of Bavaria, Germany. The genus contains a single species, B. maeuseri, known from a nearly-complete, articulated skeleton.

== Discovery and naming ==
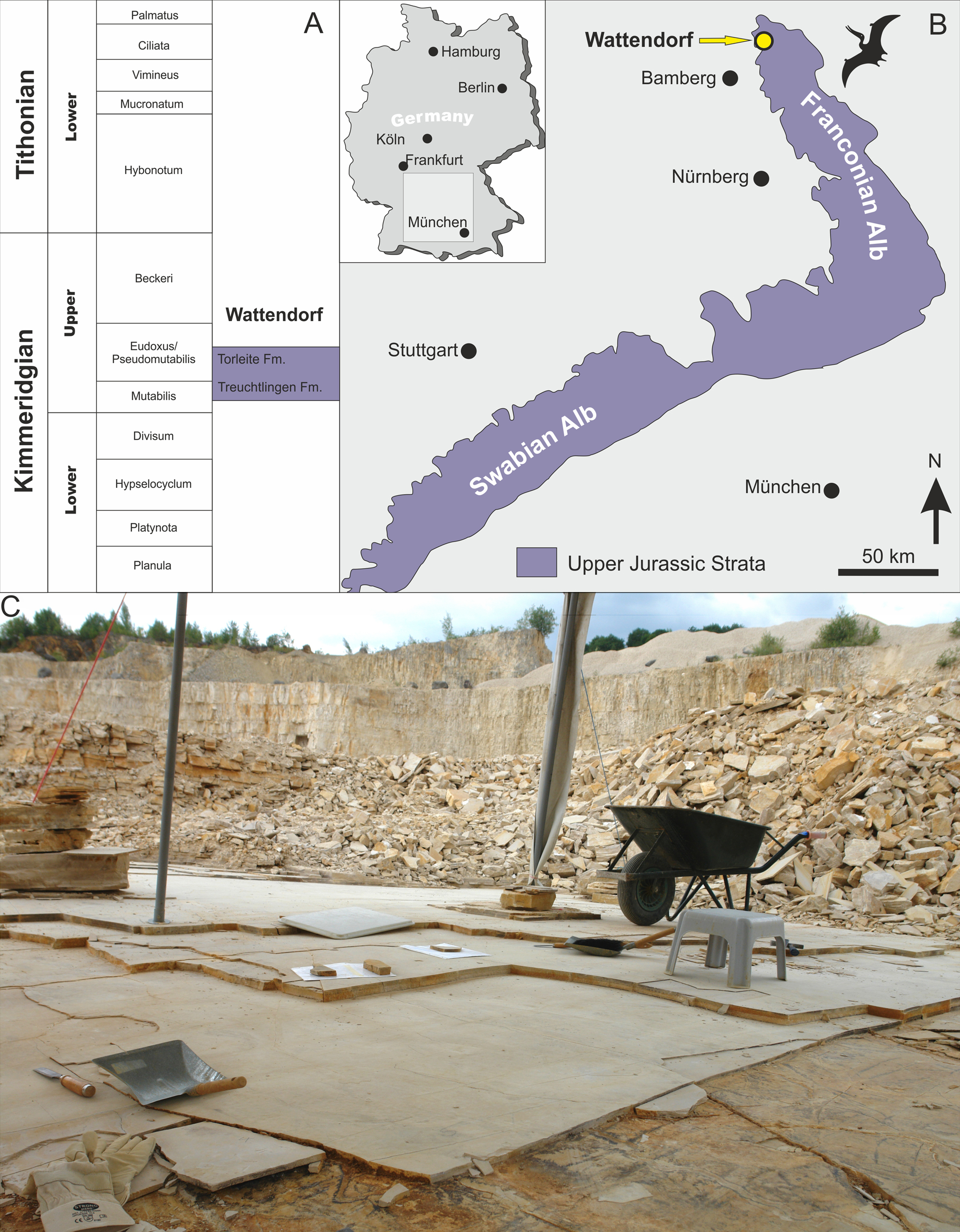
Stratigraphic horizon and locality of the holotype (Torleite Formation)

The Balaenognathus holotype specimen, NKMB P2011-633, was discovered in sediments of the Torleite Formation, dated to the upper Kimmeridgian–Tithonian ages of the late Jurassic period, near Wattendorf, Bavaria, in southern Germany. The fossil was accidentally discovered in September 2011 while crocodylomorph bones were being collected. The specimen consists of a well-preserved, nearly-complete, articulated individual. Wing membrane soft tissue is preserved in a small part of the specimen. The specimen is preserved on a slab consisting of 17 pieces, lacking only part of the left wing-finger metacarpal, the articular area of a wing-finger phalanx, including the three digits of the left wing, and a small portion of the left ilium.

In 2023, Martill et al. described Balaenognathus maeuseri, a new genus and species of ctenochasmatid pterosaurs, based on these fossil remains. The generic name, "Balaenognathus", combines a reference to the bowhead whale (Balaena mysticetus) with the Latin word "gnathus", meaning "jaw", in reference to its inferred filter feeding strategies. The specific name, "maeuseri", honours coauthor Matthias Mäuser, who died before the paper's publication.

== Description ==
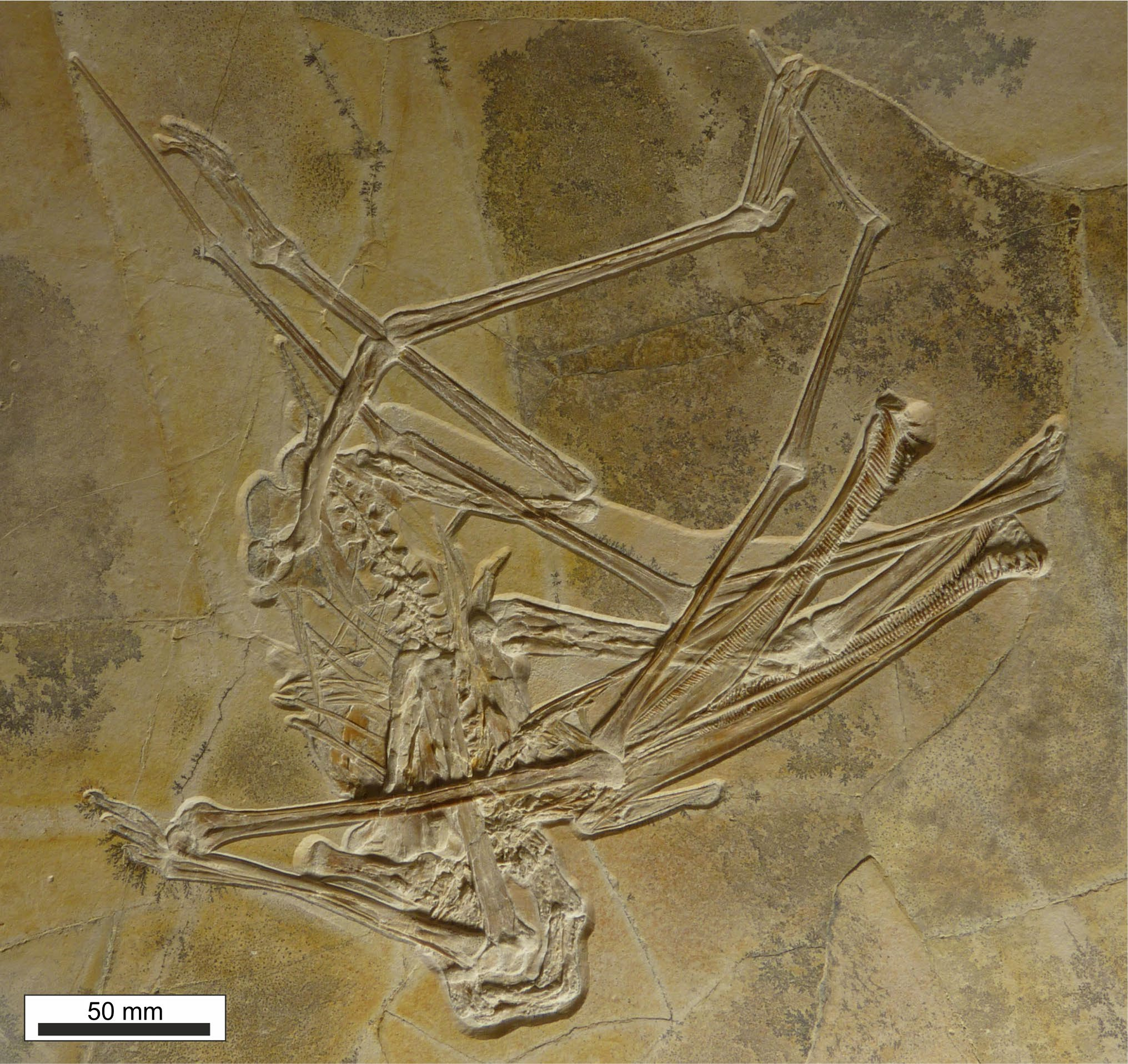
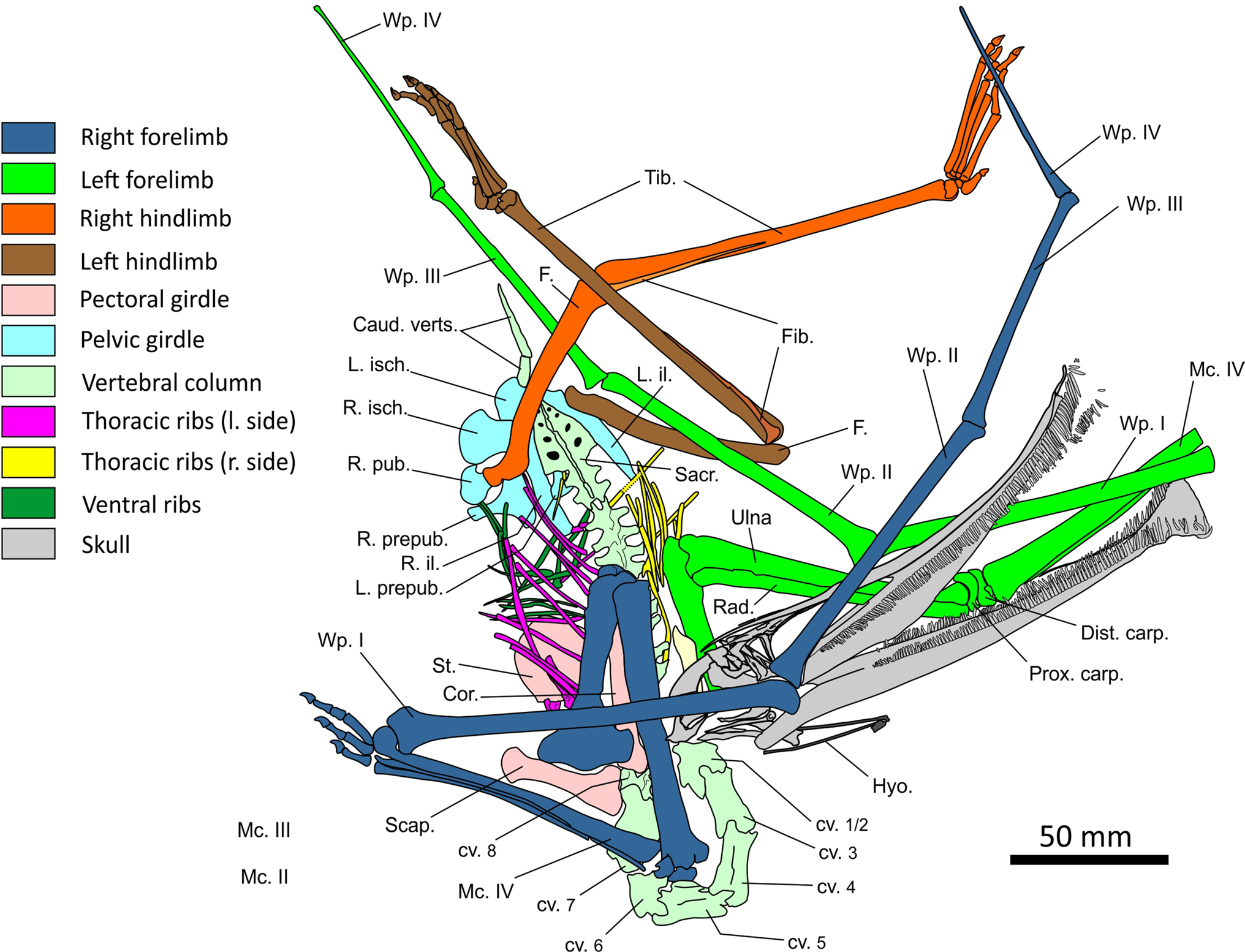
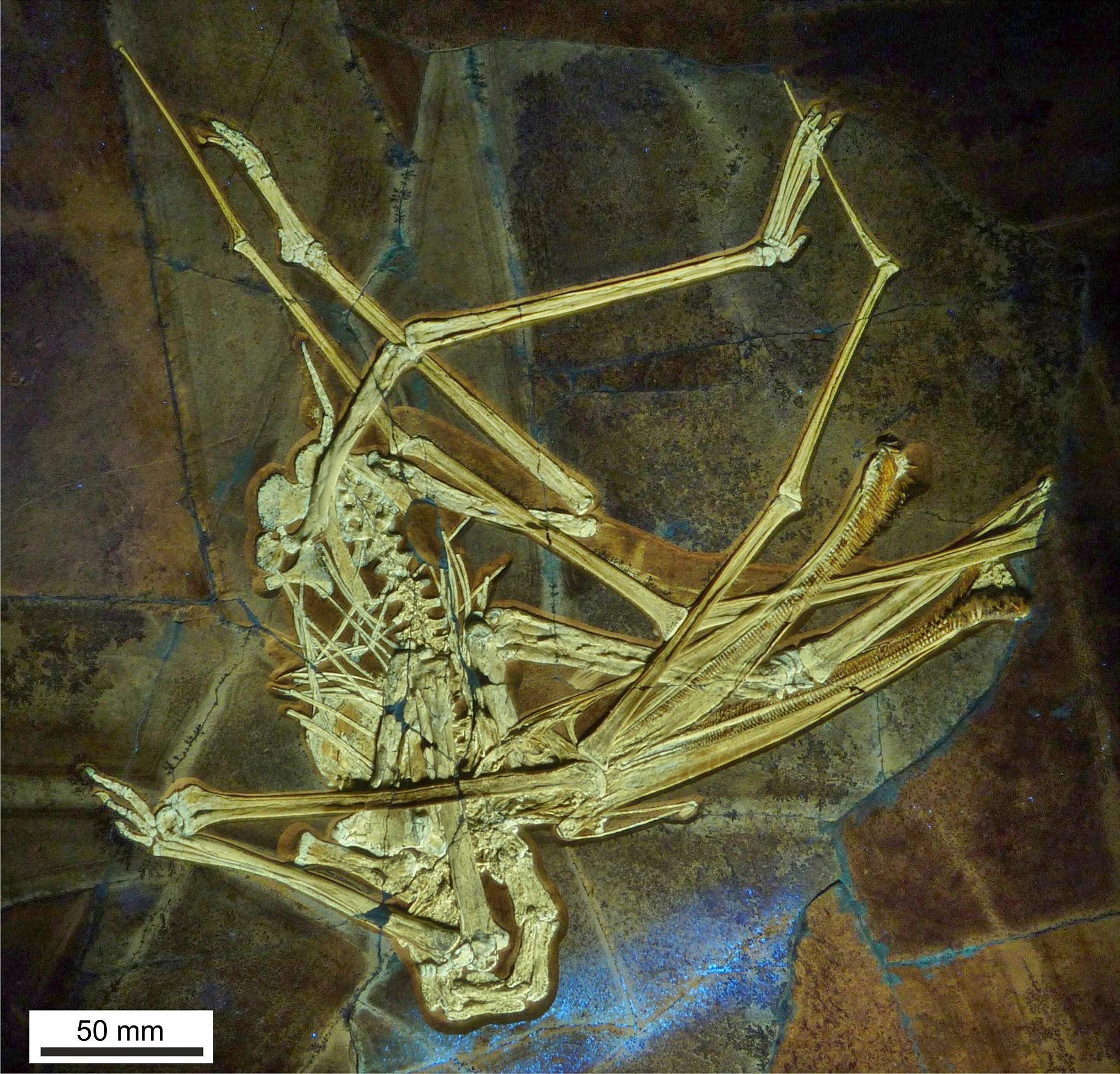
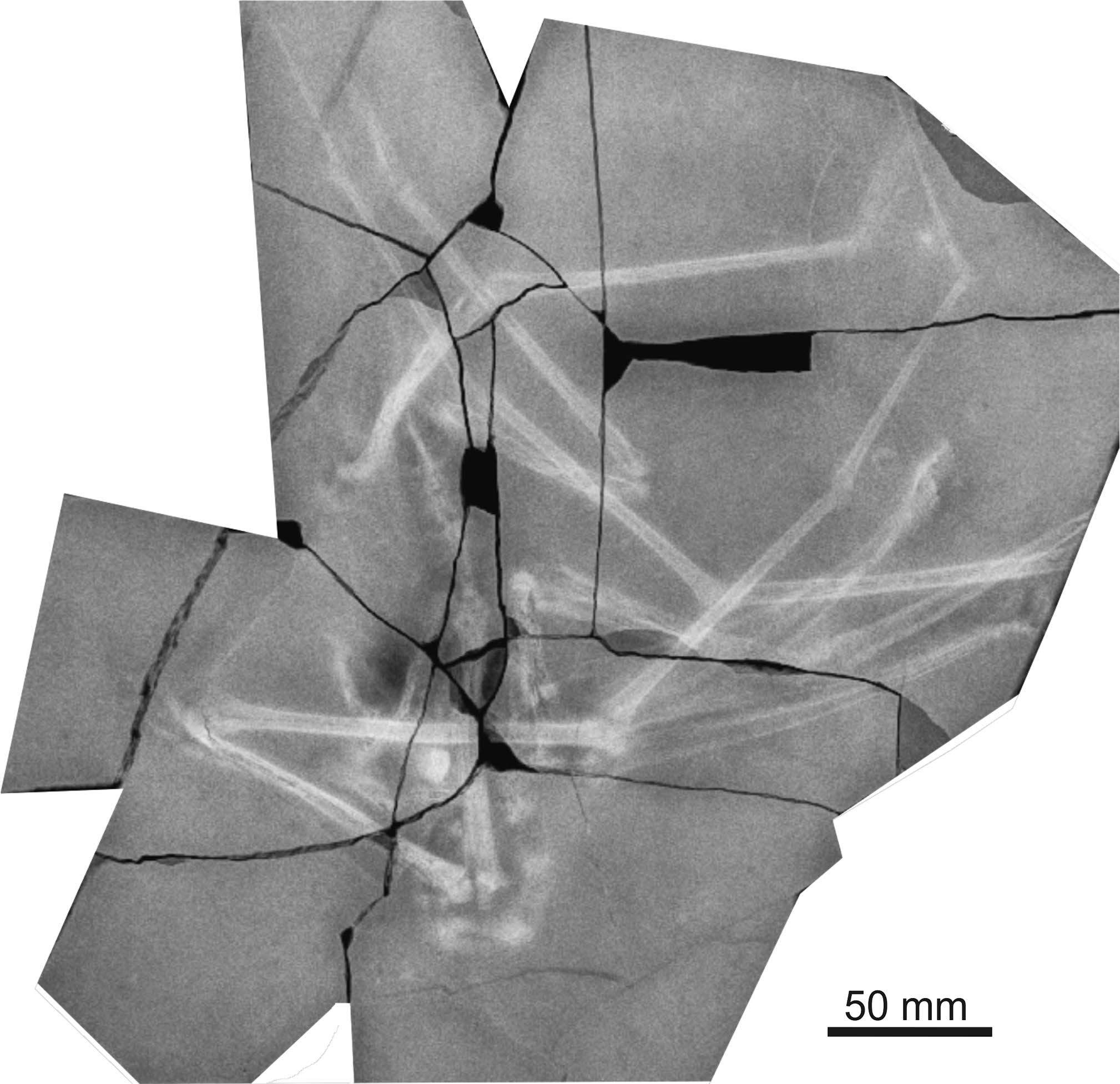
Holotype shown with scale bar (upper left), with interpretive drawing (upper right), under UV light (lower left), and X-rayed (lower right)

Balaenognathus is a medium-sized ctenochasmatid, with a wingspan of 1.17 metres (3.8 ft). Its limb bones have similar proportions to Cycnorhamphus and Pterodaustro. Its snout is very distinctive among pterosaurs, with the rostrum tip forming a wide spatula shape. The upper jaw is curved more strongly than the lower jaw, indicating that Balaenognathus would have been unable to entirely close its mouth. The holotype specimen has more than 480 needle-shaped teeth, with hooked tips. The teeth are limited to the sides of the jaw, while the front remains clear.

== Paleobiology ==
The specialized dentition and spatula-shaped rostrum strongly suggest adaptations for filter feeding. Balaenognathus may have fed in plankton-rich water, using its teeth as a form of filter trap. It likely allowed water to enter through the toothless front of the jaws, after which the water flow was split by a keel on the midline of the palate. Water could then be forced out through the interlocking teeth on both sides, allowing the food to be filtered out.

Martill et al. (2023) recognized three potential methods for maintaining water flow while feeding. Firstly, there is the possibility of active ram feeding, which requires an animal to move its head forward through the water. However, they considered that it would be impossible for an individual to skim the water with the jaws while flying, due to the high water resistance and drag that would occur. The alternate form of ram feeding would be to wade, pushing the head through the water. This is also unlikely, as the neck is too short to effectively push water up the mouth. If this is how Balaenognathus fed, the most effective angle for the head would be slightly submerged at around 30° to the water's surface.

The second proposed feeding method is passive suspension feeding, which is observed almost entirely only in extant invertebrates. In suspension feeding, the head is held still in the direction of a natural water current, flushing the suspended food into the mouth. To be effective, the water must be rich in food particles, and the animal would further depend on water flowing at a suitable speed and at an appropriate depth for the animal to stand in the current.

The third method Martill et al. proposed, gular pumping, is similar to some extant dabbling ducks, where the mouth produces an active water current. The musculus depressor mandibulae would open the mouth using the retroarticular process as a lever, creating suction to draw water in at the front. When the mouth closed, food could be obtained. Relatively flexible tooth crowns would help ensure interlocking rows of teeth. Since the jaw curvature may have caused water loss at the front, this could be compensated by an increased swallowing capacity through a vertical downward movement of the powerful tongue. An upward movement would have enhanced the squeezing action. With this method, the animal's head could be completely submerged underwater. Balaenognathus likely implemented both passive suspension feeding and gular pumping.

== Classification ==
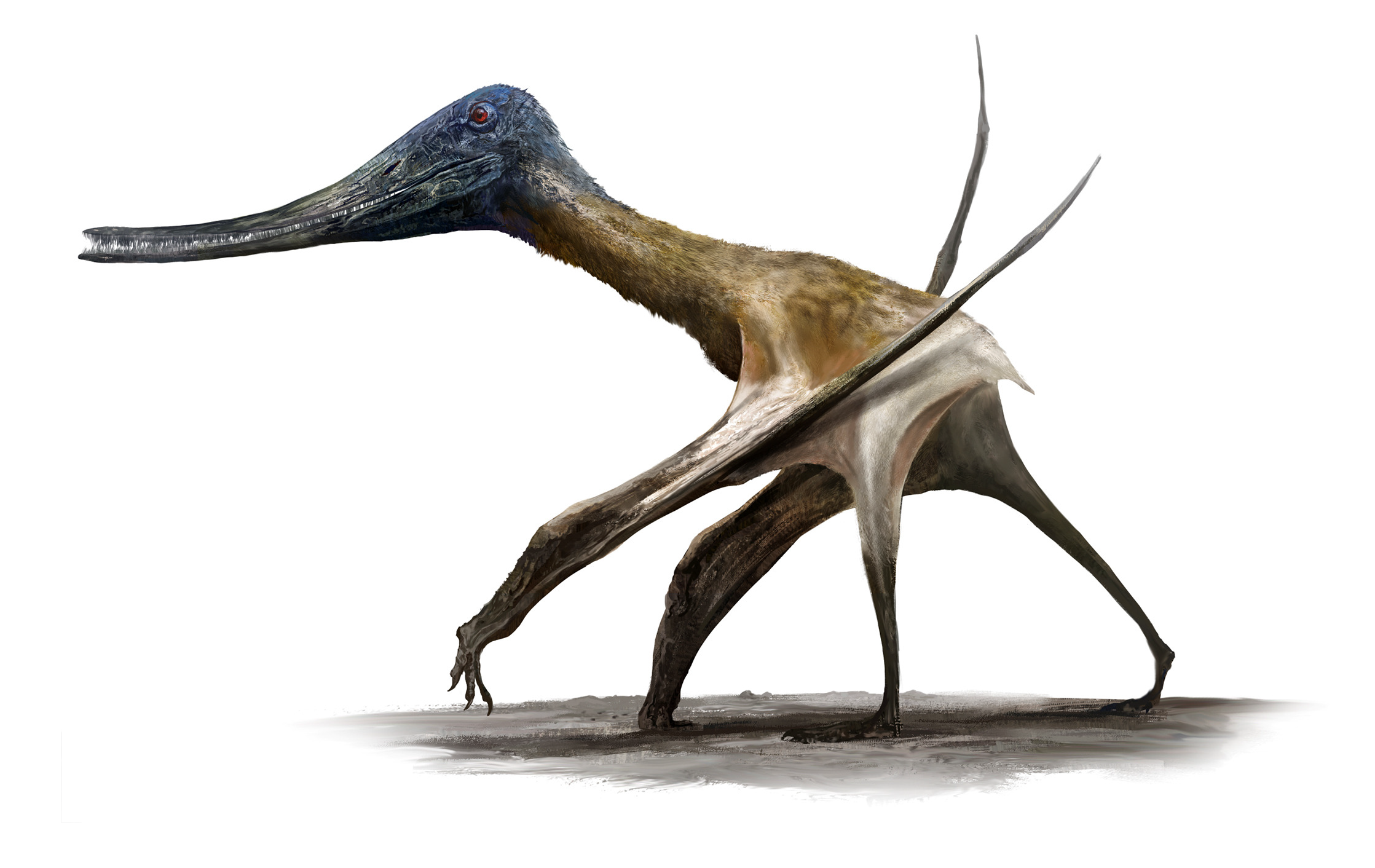
Speculative life restoration

Martill et al. (2023) recovered Balaenognathus as a member of the Ctenochasmatidae, as the sister taxon to a clade formed by Aurorazhdarcho, Gladocephaloideus, Feilongus, Moganopterus, and Lonchodectes. Their results are shown in the cladogram below:

- Ctenochasmatidae
  - Pterodaustro
  - Ctenochasma
  - Eosipterus
  - Gnathosaurus
  - Liaodactylus
  - - Balaenognathus
    - - Aurorazhdarcho
      - - Gladocephaloideus
        - - Feilongus
          - Moganopterus
          - Lonchodectes

== Paleoenvironment ==
Balaenognathus was discovered in layers of the Torleite Formation, which dates to the upper Kimmeridgian, between 152.1 ± 0.9 and 157.3 ± 1.0 million years ago. The dinosaur Sciurumimus has also been described from the formation. Fossils belonging to crocodylomorphs, turtles (Eurysternum), rhynchocephalians (Sphenofontis), fish, and ammonites (Aulacostephanus eudoxus) have also been discovered there.
