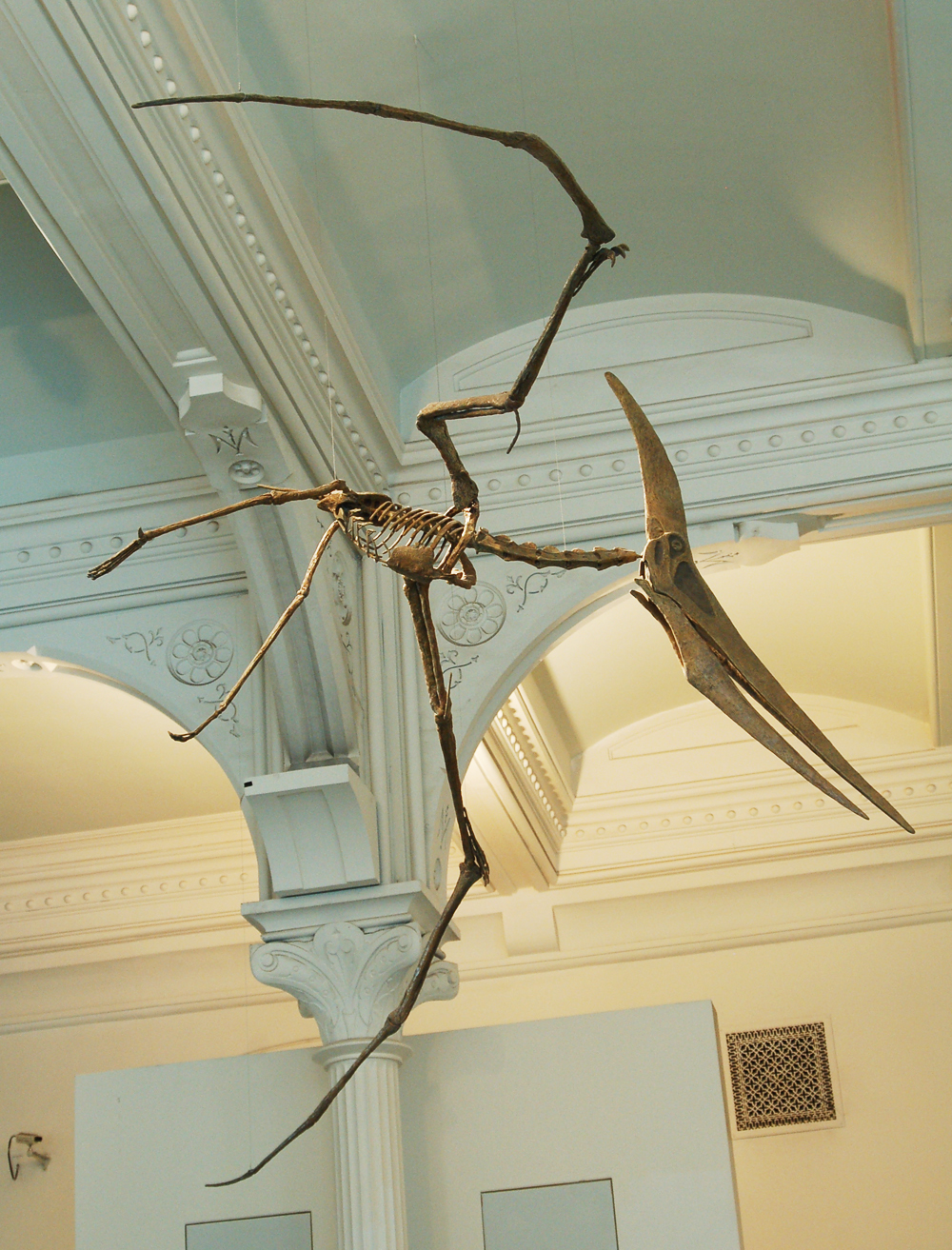
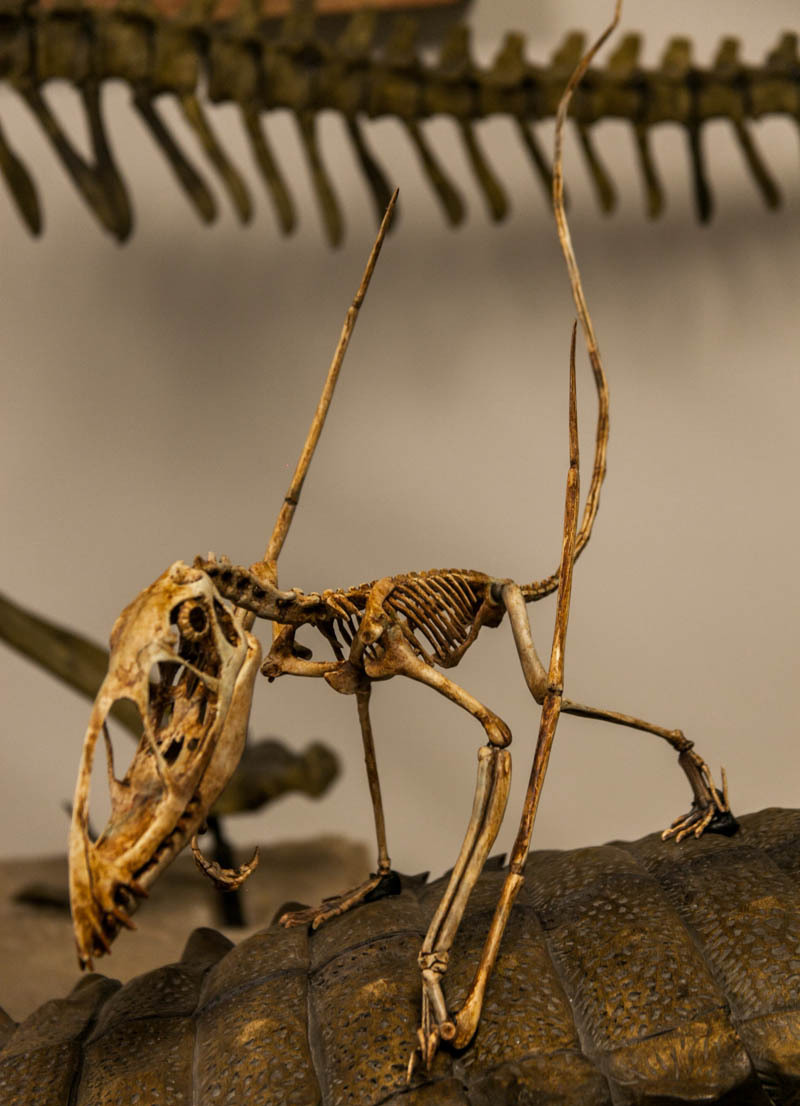
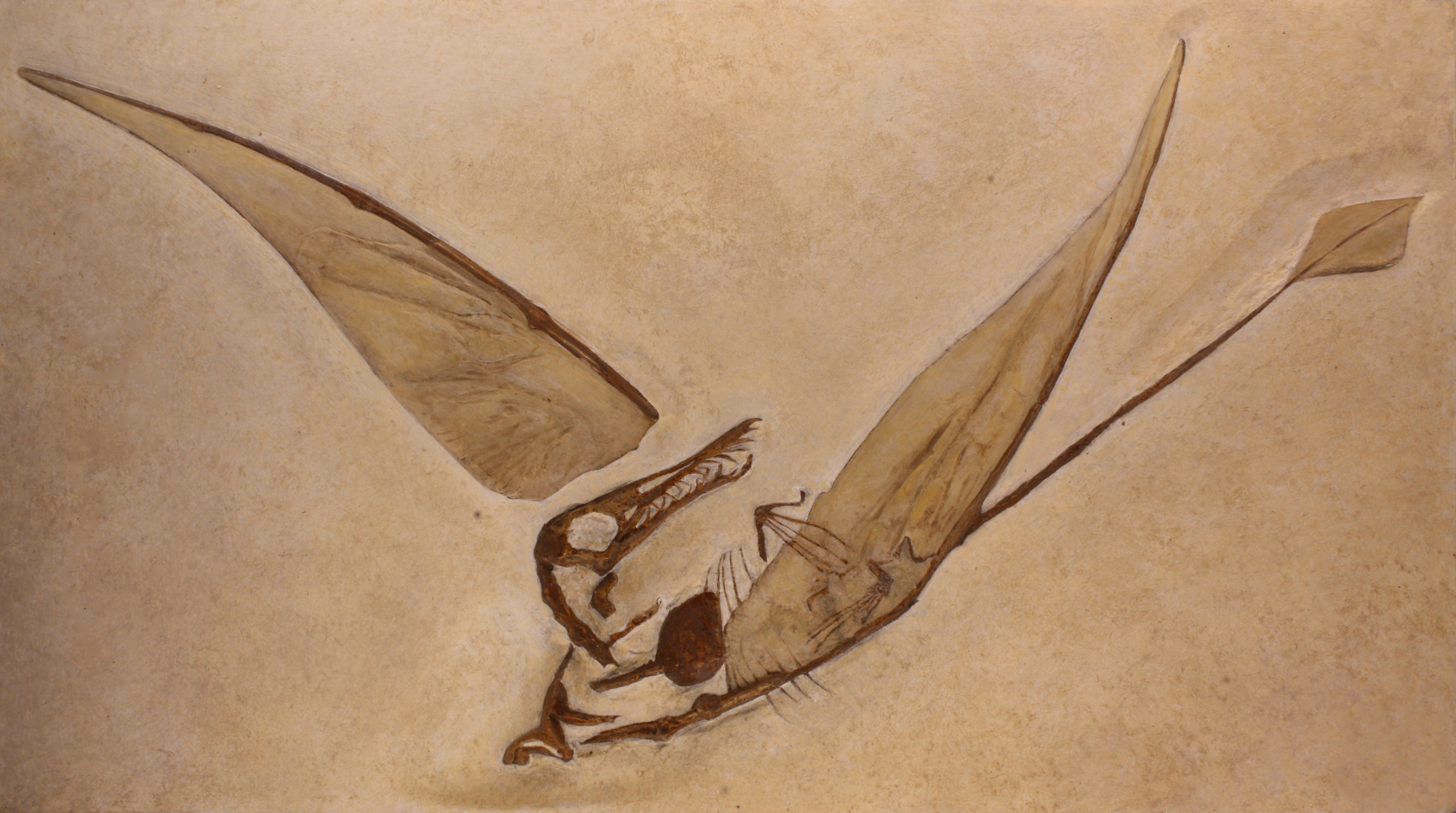
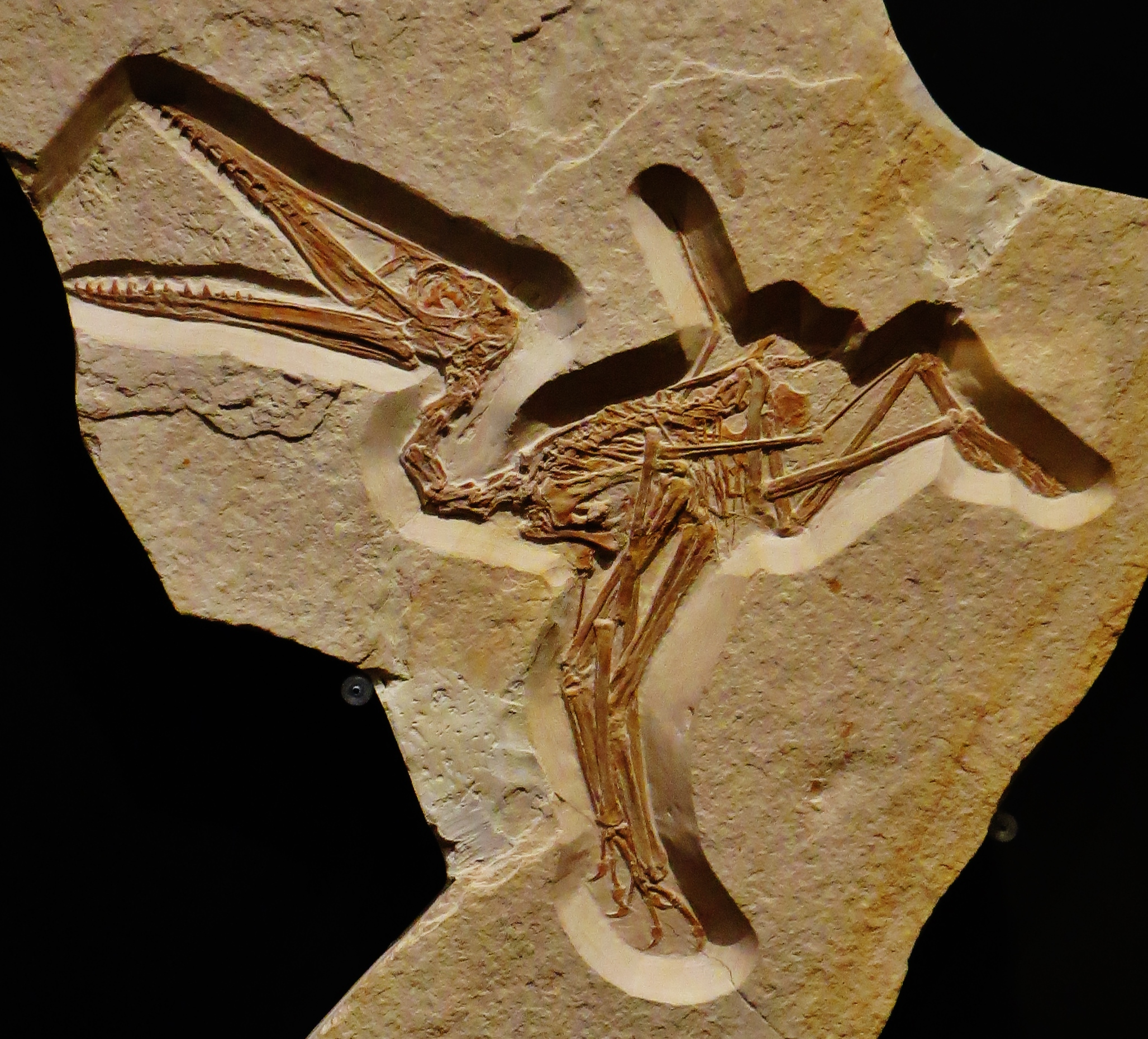
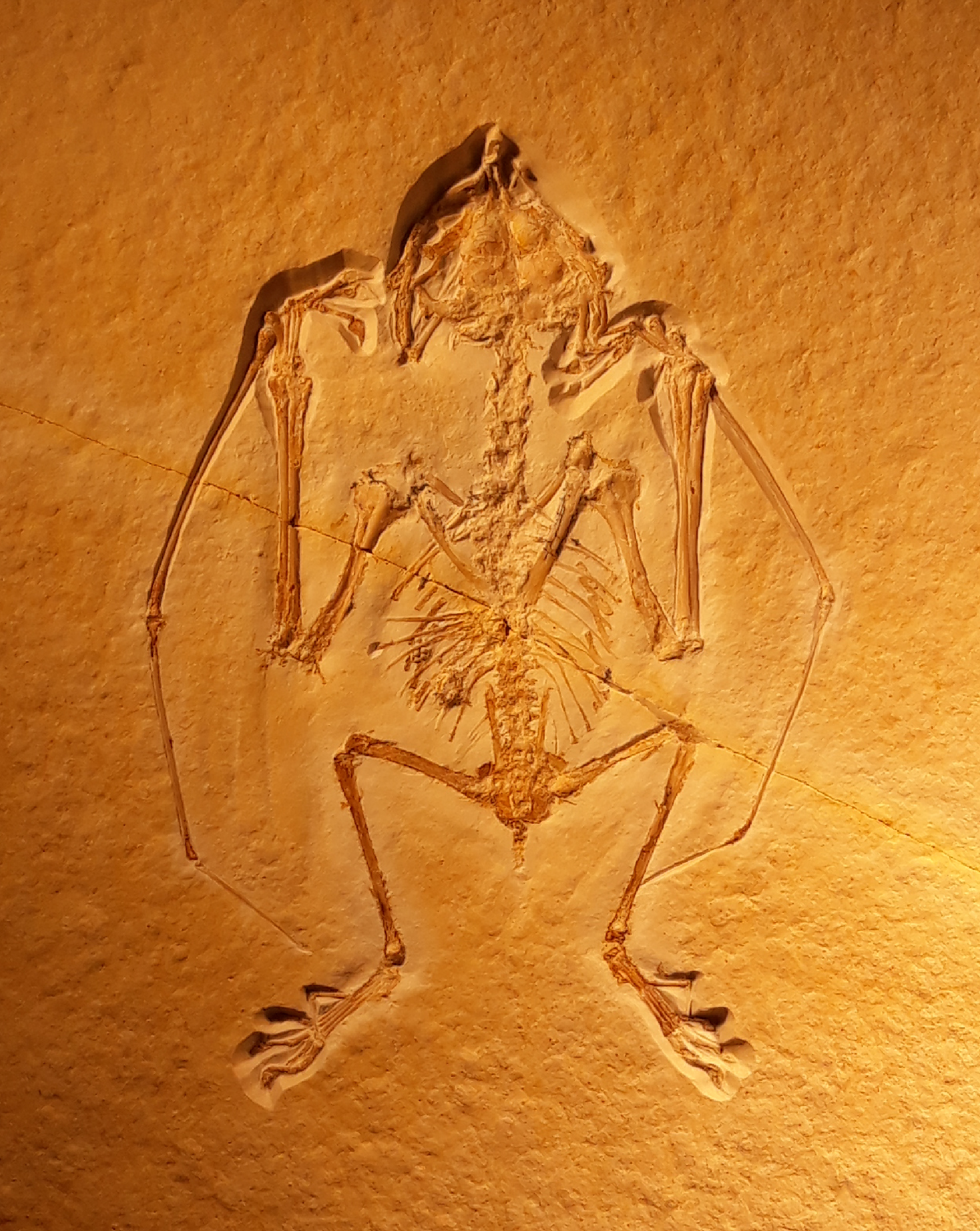
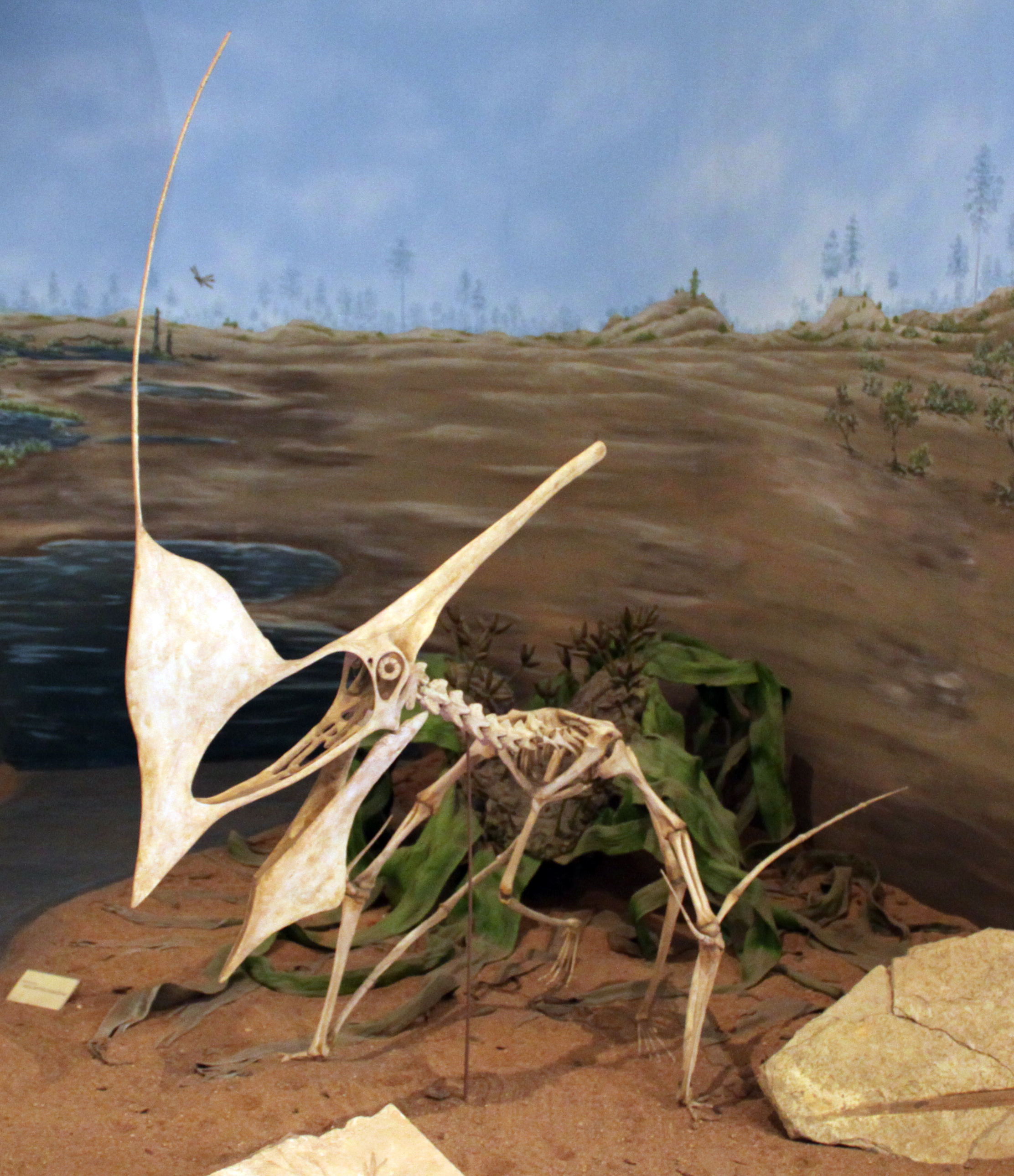
- Six pterosaurs (clockwise from top left): Pteranodon, Dimorphodon, Pterodactylus, Tupandactylus, Anurognathus, and Rhamphorhynchus

Scientific classification
- Kingdom: Animalia
- Phylum: Chordata
- Class: Reptilia
- Clade: Archosauria
- Clade: Avemetatarsalia
- Clade: Ornithodira
- Clade: †Pterosauromorpha
- Order: †Pterosauria; Kaup, 1834/Owen, 1842

Subgroups
- †Eotephradactylus; †Peteinosaurus; †Eopterosauria; †Dimorphodontidae; †Preondactylia; †Austriadactylus; †Preondactylus; †Novialoidea; †Campylognathoides; †Anurognathidae?; †Breviquartossa; †Sordes; †Rhamphorhynchidae; †Monofenestrata

= Pterosaur =

Pterosaur Temporal range: Late Triassic–Late Cretaceous, 228–66 Ma

Extinct order of flying reptiles

Pterosaurs (Note: /ˈtɛrəsɔːr, ˈtɛroʊ-/ TERR-ə-sor, TERR-oh-) (Note: from Greek pteron and sauros, meaning 'wing lizard') are an extinct clade of warm-blooded flying reptiles in the order Pterosauria. They existed during most of the Mesozoic: from the Late Triassic to the end of the Cretaceous (228 million to 66 million years ago). Pterosaurs are the earliest vertebrates known to have evolved powered flight. Their wings were formed by a membrane of skin, muscle, and other tissues stretching from the ankles to a dramatically lengthened fourth finger.

Traditionally, pterosaurs were divided into two major types. Basal pterosaurs (also called non-pterodactyloid pterosaurs or 'rhamphorhynchoids') were smaller animals, with up to a two-metre (6 ft 7 in) wingspan, fully toothed jaws and, typically, long tails. Their wide wing membranes probably included and connected the hindlimbs. On the ground, they would have had an awkward sprawling posture due to short metacarpals, but the anatomy of their joints and strong claws would have made them effective climbers, and some may have lived in trees. Basal pterosaurs were insectivores, piscivores or predators of small land vertebrates. Later pterosaurs (pterodactyloids) evolved many sizes, shapes, and lifestyles. Pterodactyloids had narrower wings with free hindlimbs, highly reduced tails, and long necks with large heads. On the ground, they walked well on all four limbs due to long metacarpals with an upright posture, standing plantigrade on the hind feet and folding the wing finger upward to walk on the metacarpals with the three smaller fingers of the hand pointing to the rear. They could take off from the ground, and fossil trackways show that at least some species were able to run, wade, and/or swim. Their jaws had horny beaks, and some groups lacked teeth. Some groups developed elaborate head crests with sexual dimorphism. Since 2010 it is understood that many species, the basal Monofenestrata, were intermediate in build, combining an advanced long skull with long tails.

Pterosaurs sported coats of hair-like filaments known as pycnofibers, which covered their bodies and parts of their wings. Pycnofibers grew in several forms, from simple filaments to branching down feathers. These may be homologous to the down feathers found on both avian and some non-avian dinosaurs, suggesting that early feathers evolved in the common ancestor of pterosaurs and dinosaurs, possibly as insulation. They were warm-blooded (endothermic), active animals. The respiratory system had efficient unidirectional "flow-through" breathing using air sacs, which hollowed out their bones to an extreme extent. Pterosaurs spanned a wide range of adult sizes, from the very small anurognathids to the largest known flying creatures, including Quetzalcoatlus and Hatzegopteryx, which reached wingspans of at least nine metres. The combination of endothermy, a good oxygen supply and strong muscles made pterosaurs powerful and capable flyers.

Pterosaurs are often referred to by popular media or the general public as "flying dinosaurs", but dinosaurs are defined as the descendants of the last common ancestor of the Saurischia and Ornithischia, which excludes the pterosaurs. Pterosaurs are nonetheless more closely related to birds and other dinosaurs than to crocodiles or any other living reptile, though they are not bird ancestors. Pterosaurs are also colloquially referred to as pterodactyls, particularly in fiction and journalism. However, technically, pterodactyl may refer to members of the genus Pterodactylus, and more broadly to members of the suborder Pterodactyloidea of the pterosaurs.

Pterosaurs had a variety of lifestyles. Traditionally seen as fish-eaters, the group is now understood to have also included hunters of land animals, insectivores, fruit eaters and even predators of other pterosaurs. They reproduced by eggs, some fossils of which have been discovered.

== Anatomy ==
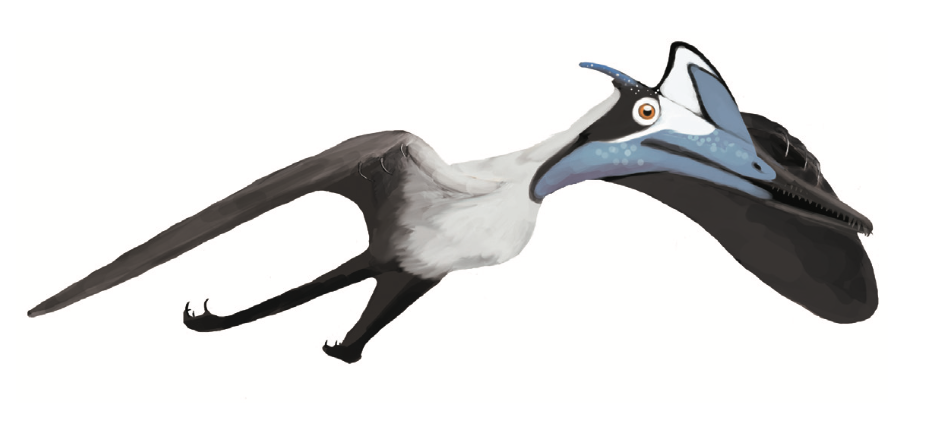
Life reconstruction of Pterodactylus

The anatomy of pterosaurs was highly modified from their reptilian ancestors by the adaptation to flight. Pterosaur bones were hollow and air-filled, like those of birds. This provided a higher muscle attachment surface for a given skeletal weight. The bone walls were often paper-thin. They had a large and keeled breastbone for flight muscles and an enlarged brain able to coordinate complex flying behaviour. Pterosaur skeletons often show considerable fusion. In the skull, the sutures between elements disappeared. In some later pterosaurs, the backbone over the shoulders fused into a structure known as a notarium, which served to stiffen the torso during flight, and provide a stable support for the shoulder blade. Likewise, the sacral vertebrae could form a single synsacrum while the pelvic bones fused also.

=== Size ===
Wide variation in Late Cretaceous pterosaur size, compared to birds and a human

Pterosaurs were highly diverse in size, and some were the largest flying organisms in earth's history. Early pterosaurs of the Triassic and Jurassic periods were typically small animals with wingspans only up to 2 metres (6 ft 7 in), while most Cretaceous pterosaurs were larger. Some isolated specimens indicate exceptions to this rule, and the divisions of size across time may be a partial result of an incomplete fossil record. Anurognathids may have been the smallest pterosaurs, with wingspans of as small as 0.4 metres (1 ft 4 in), though the age of these individuals remains uncertain. The largest pterosaurs were members of Azhdarchidae such as Hatzegopteryx and Quetzalcoatlus, which could attain estimated wingspans of 10–11 metres (33–36 ft) and weights of 150–250 kilograms (330–550 lb).

=== Skull ===
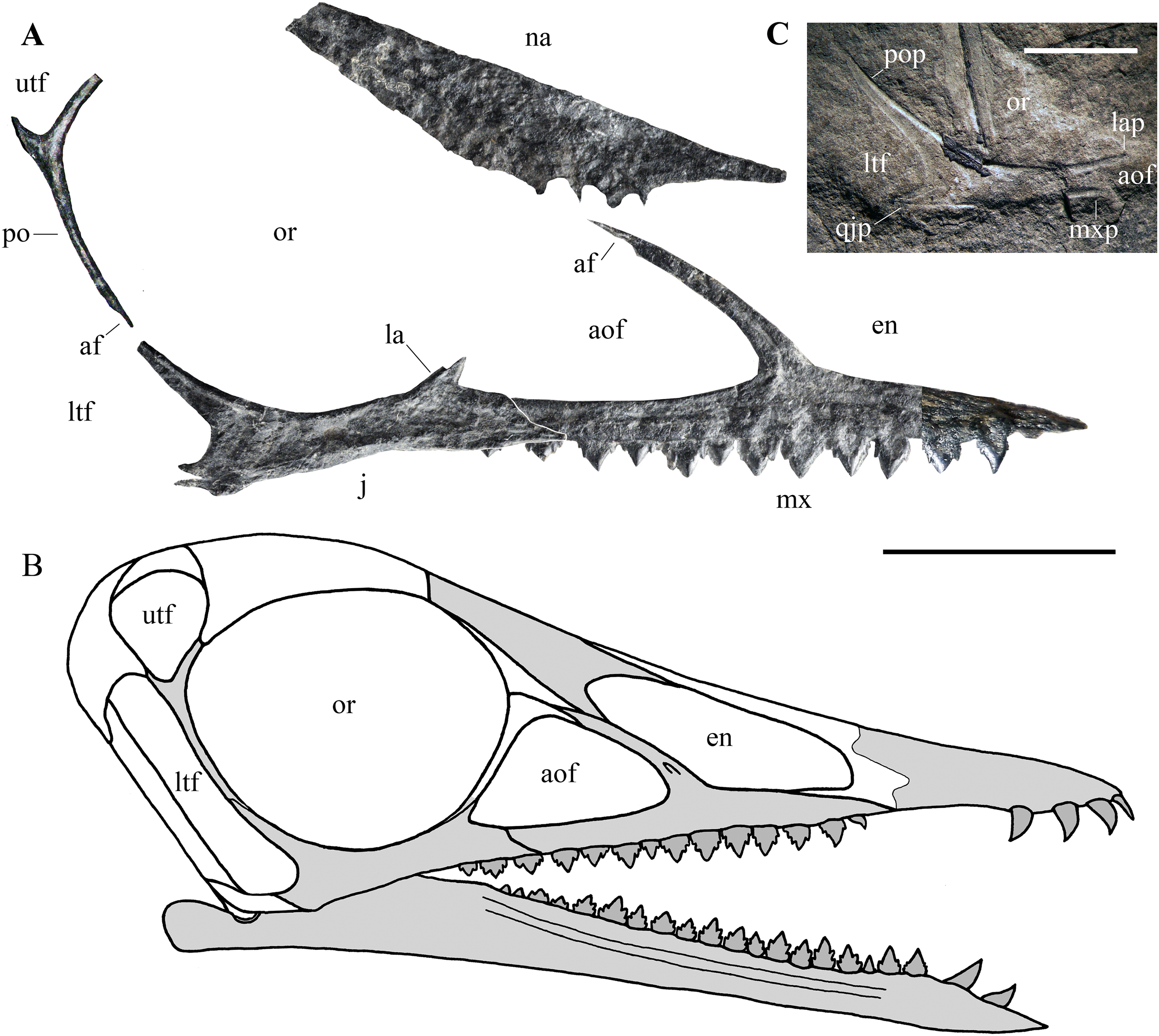
Skull of an early pterosaur, Seazzadactylus

Pterosaurs have large skulls compared to other flying vertebrates, the birds and bats. Later pterosaurs had very elongated skulls, sometimes longer than the whole torso. Many bones were fused in adults. The skulls were pierced by multiple large holes: the bony nostrils, eye sockets, the antorbital fenestrae in the snout side and two temporal fenestrae on each rear side. Monofenestratan pterosaurs fused the nasal and antorbital fenestra into a single large nasoantorbital fenestra. The back of the head was at first vertical in orientation, but rotated to nearly horizontal later in evolution of some groups. The paired lower jaws were fused at the front into an elongated mandibular symphysis. The lower jaws of the earliest pterosaurs were pierced at the rear by a mandibular fenestra, but this was lost in later species.

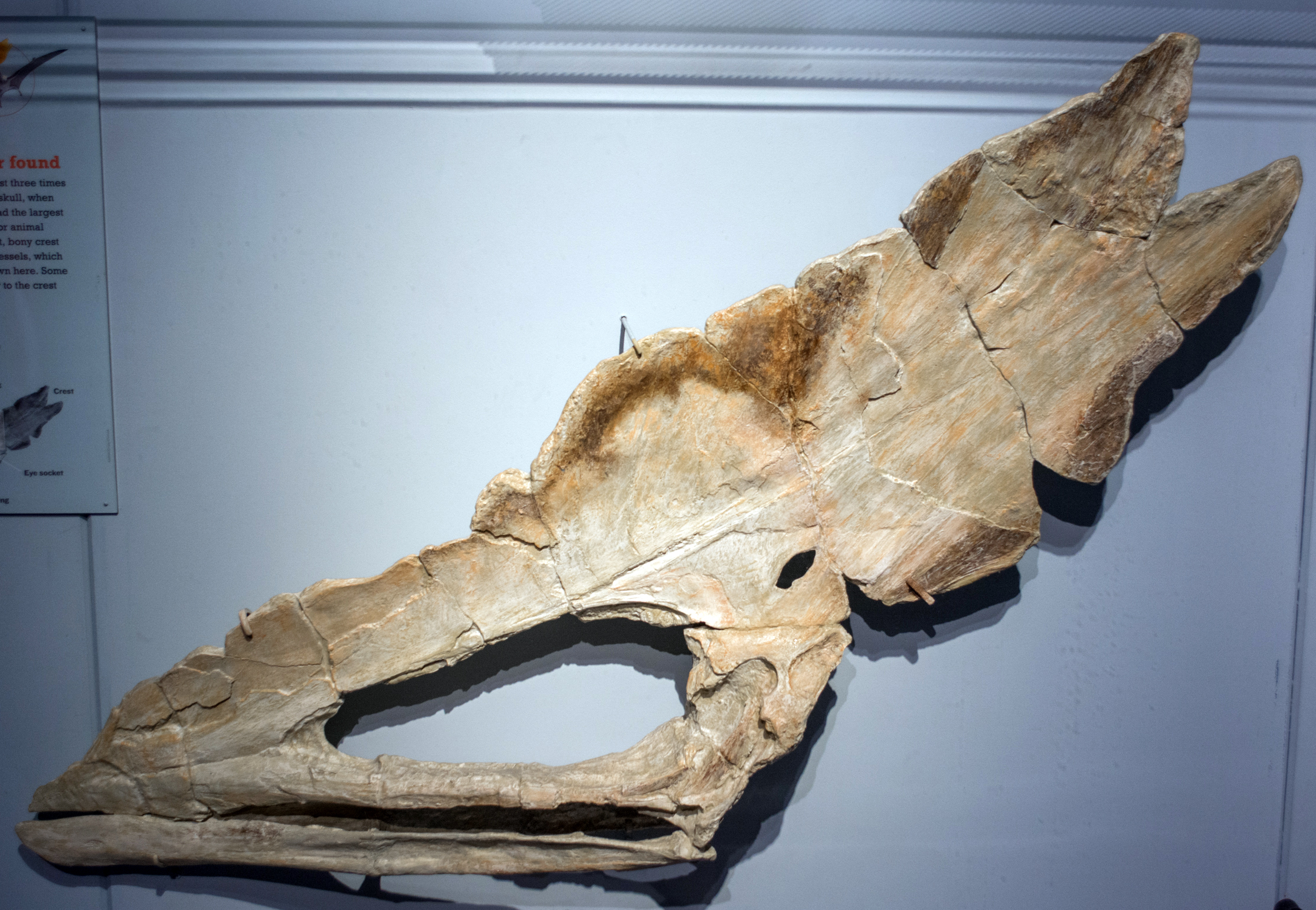
Skull of Thalassodromeus (front on left), showing extensive crest, nasantorbital fenestra, and toothless beak

The snout or the back of the skull often sported an upward projecting crest, sometimes of enormous size. The lower jaws could likewise feature a downward projecting keel. These crests could be expanded in size and shape with soft tissues. Some crests entirely lacked a bone core, with their presence only known from exceptionally well preserved specimens.

Early pterosaurs were heterodont, with multiple tooth types. Later pterosaurs were homodont, having a single tooth form, often elongated and conical, throughout the skull. The teeth were replaced continuously throughout life. Between species, the dentition varied considerably. Fish eaters often had longer teeth in an expansion of the jaw tips. Filter feeders could have a sieve of up to a thousand teeth. Some later pterosaur groups were entirely toothless, featuring a horny beak similar to that of birds. Most species had some keratinized beak tissue, though never in the same snout section as the teeth.

=== Neck and torso ===
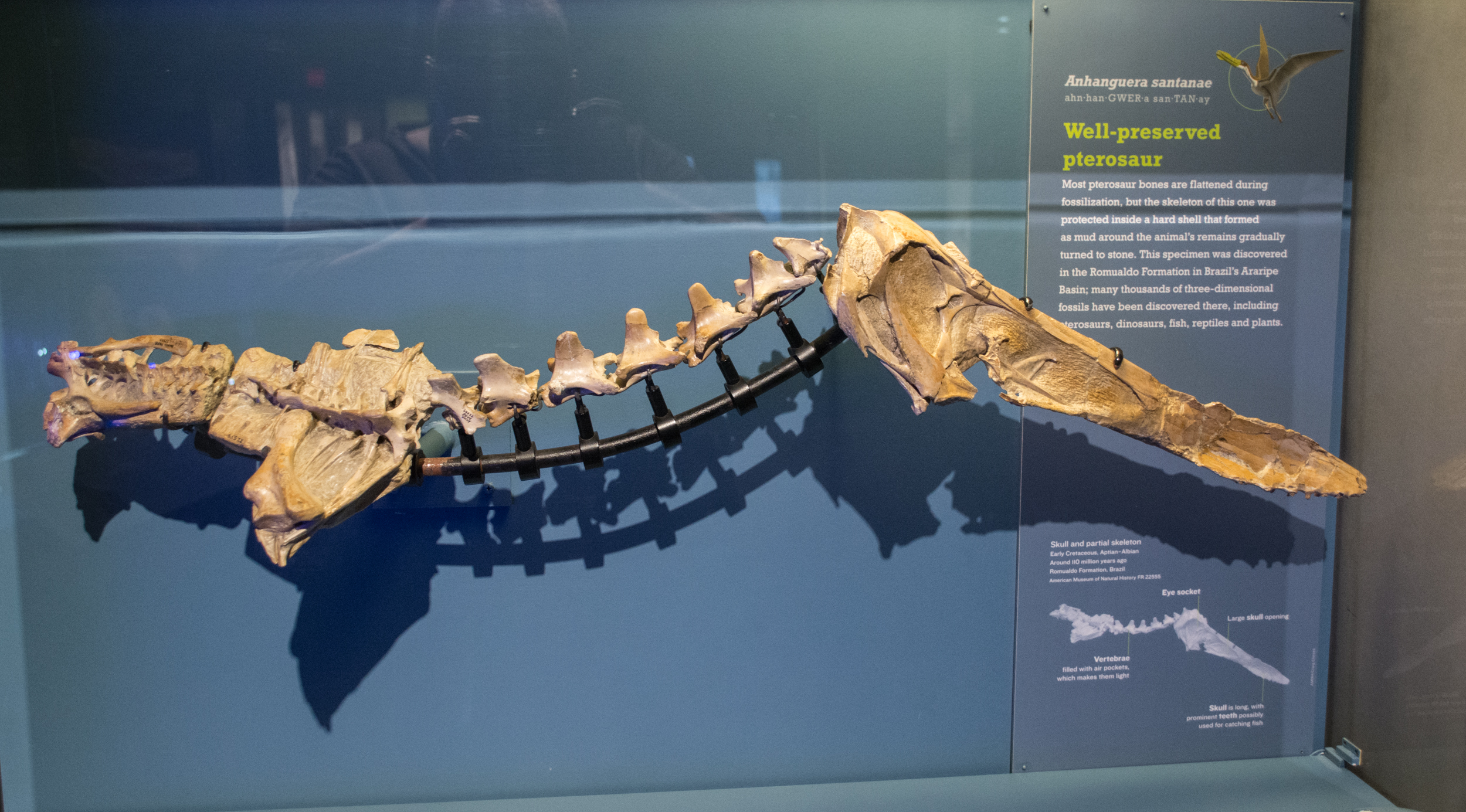
Skull and torso of Anhanguera, showing long neck and compact torso

The vertebral column of pterosaurs had up to seventy vertebrae. Later pterosaurs have unique structures at the sides of the vertebrae, called exapophyses, and the concave fronts may possess a midline prong, the hypapophysis. Pterosaur necks were typically long, deep, and straight, and in pterodactyloids was longer than the torso. The number of neck vertebrae is always seven, or nine if one includes two trunk vertebrae. Pterodactyloids have lost all neck ribs. The neck was deep and well-muscled.

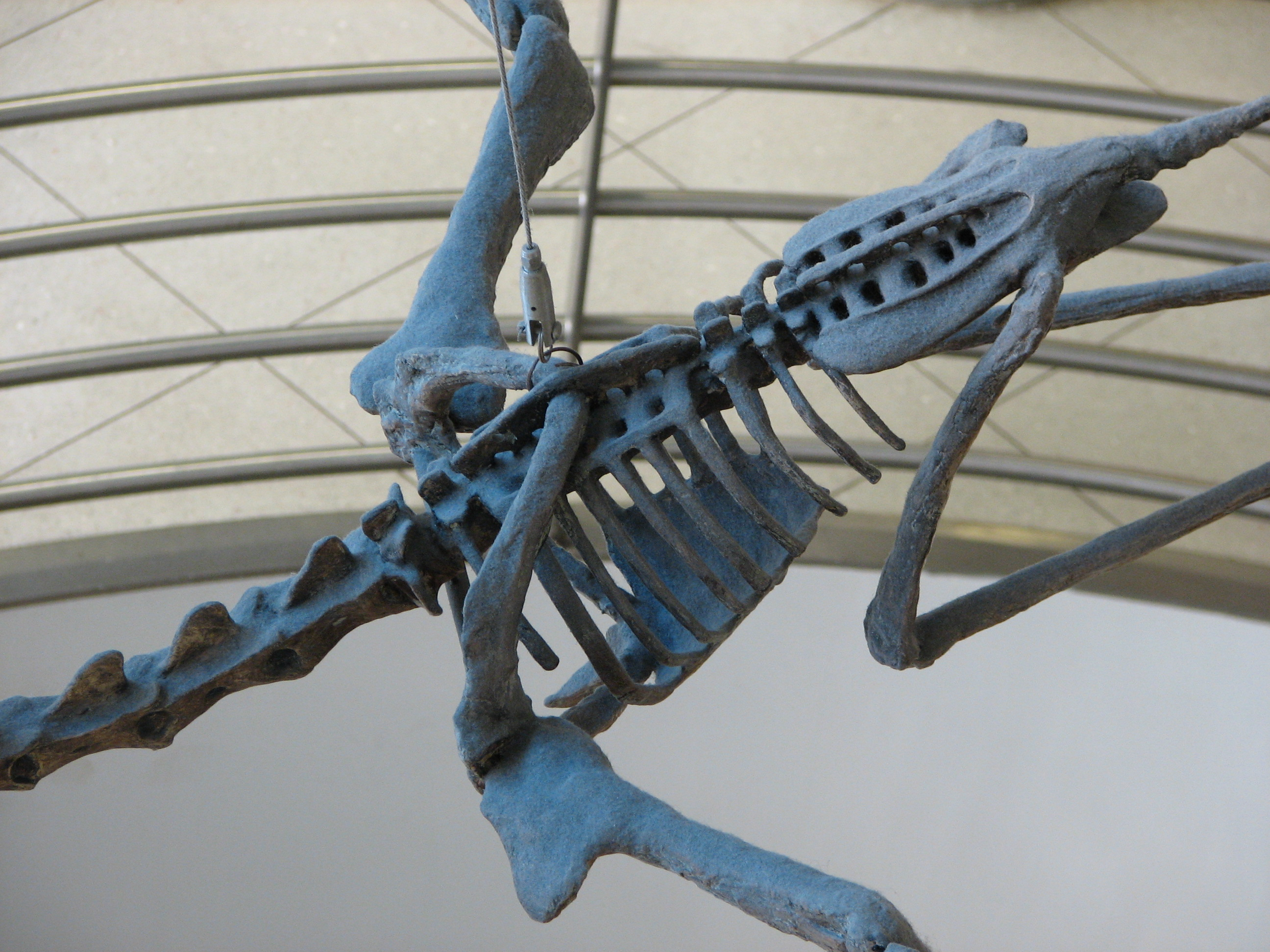
Pterosaur torso showing the fused front of the torso (notarium), shoulder girdle connected to it and the large breastbone, and the fused pelvic region

The torso was short and compact. Up to seven front back vertebrae and ribs can be fused into a rigid structure known as a notarium.

The shoulder girdle was strong and well-muscled, with the upper shoulder blade and connected lower coracoid fused in later species into a single scapulocoracoid. The top of this structure fitted to the notarium, while the lower end connected to the breastbone, forming a rigid closed loop, better to withstand the forces of flapping flight. The shoulder joint was saddle-shaped allowing considerable movement to the wing. It faced obliquely sideways and upwards.

The breastbone was wide with a shallow keel, via sternal ribs attached to the dorsal ribs. Behind it, belly ribs (gastralia) covered the entire belly. To the front, a long pointy structure termed the cristospina jutted obliquely upwards. The thorax was deepest at the rear of the breastbone. There were no (inter)clavicles.

The pelvis of pterosaurs was of moderate size compared to the body as a whole. Often the three pelvic bones were fused. The sacrum had up to ten sacral vertebrae, sometimes connected by a bar in a similar fashion to the notarium. The ilium was long and low, its front and rear blades projecting horizontally beyond the edges of the lower pelvic bones. Despite this length, the rod-like form of these processes indicates that the hindlimb muscles attached to them were limited in strength. Then, in side view narrow, pubic bone fused with the broad ischium into an ischiopubic blade. Sometimes, the blades of both sides were also fused, closing the pelvis from below and forming the pelvic canal. The hip joint was not perforated and allowed considerable mobility to the leg. It was directed obliquely upwards, preventing a perfectly vertical position of the leg. The front of the pubic bones articulated with a unique structure, the paired prepubic bones. Together these formed a cusp covering the rear belly, between the pelvis and the belly ribs. The vertical mobility of this element suggests a function in breathing, compensating the relative rigidity of the chest cavity.

=== Wings ===
==== Wing membranes ====
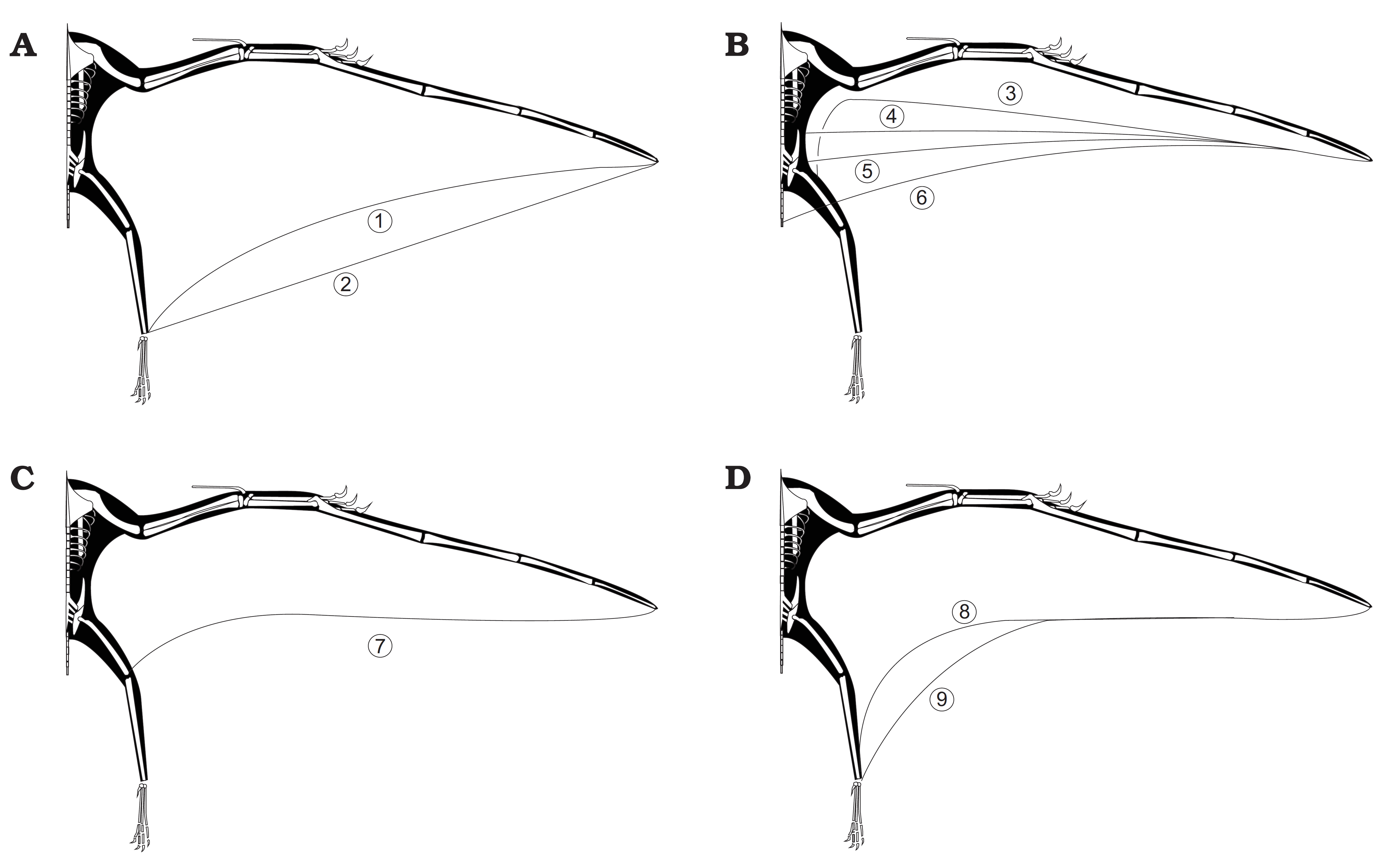
Various configurations proposed for the wings of pterosaurs

The primary wing membranes attached to the extremely long fourth fingers, probably extending to the ankles. The profile of the trailing edge is uncertain. The membranes were not leathery flaps composed of skin but highly complex dynamic structures suited to serve an active flight style. They were strengthened by closely spaced fibers called actinofibrils, in three distinct layers in the wing, in a crisscross pattern superimposed on one another. They had a stiffening or strengthening function. Also a thin layer of muscle, fibrous tissue, and a unique, complex circulatory system of looping blood vessels was present. This combination may have allowed the animal to adjust the wing slackness and camber to control lift.

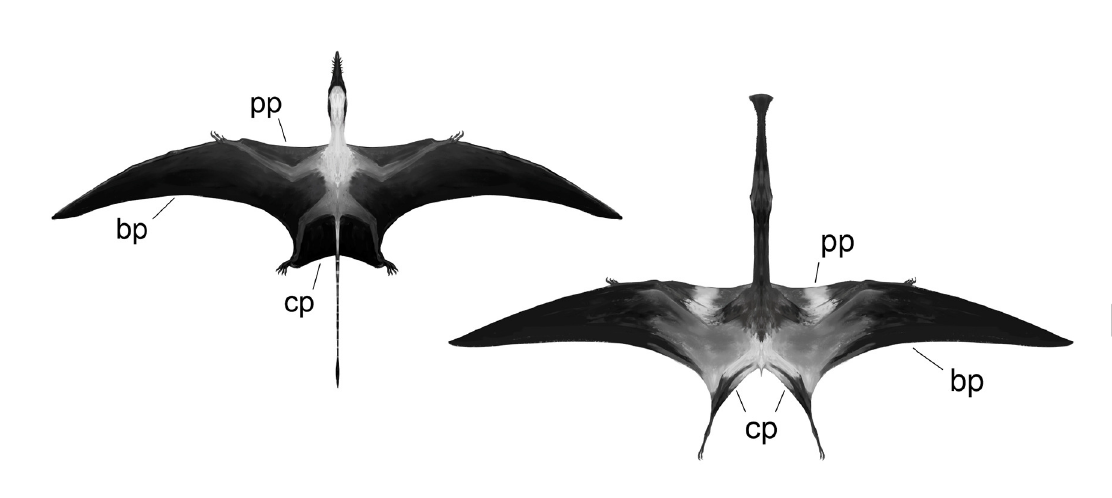
Two pterosaurs (Scaphognathus and Balaenognathus) in dorsal view, with wing parts labeled (bp: brachiopatagium, cp: cruropatagium, pp: propatagium)

The wing membrane is divided into three parts. The propatagium ("fore membrane"), was the forward-most part of the wing and attached between the wrist and shoulder, creating the "leading edge" during flight. The brachiopatagium ("arm membrane") stretched from the fourth finger to the hindlimb. Finally, a membrane that stretched between the legs, possibly incorporated the tail, called the uropatagium. It might only have connected the legs, rendering it a cruropatagium. Early pterosaurs perhaps had a broader uro/cruropatagium stretching between their long fifth toes; pterodactyloids, lacking such toes, only had membranes running along the legs. Fossils of the rhamphorhynchoid Sordes, the anurognathid Jeholopterus, suggest that the wing membrane did attach to the hindlimbs. However, pterosaur limb proportions show that there was considerable variation in wing-plans.

==== Wing bones ====
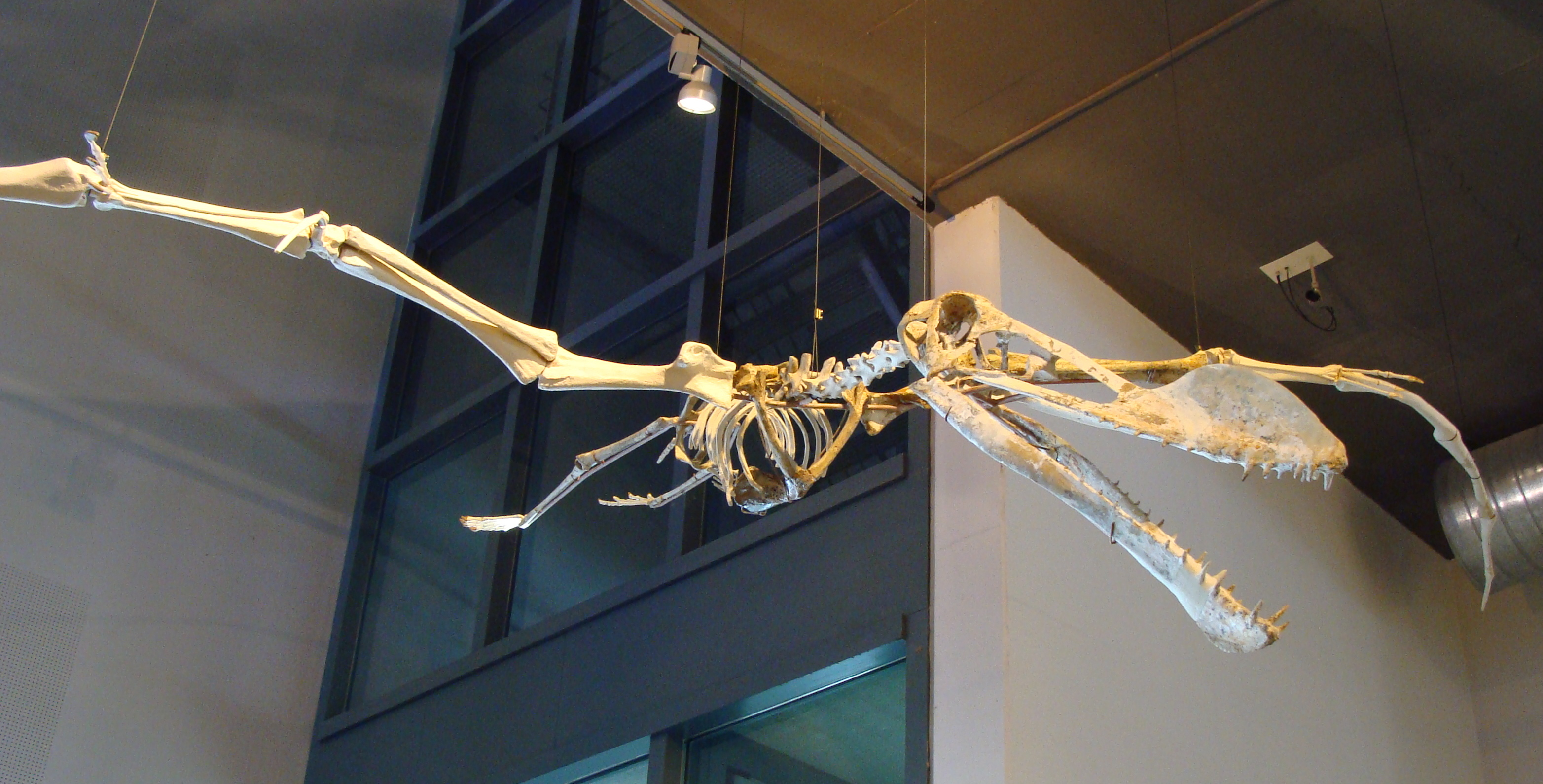
Skeletal reconstruction of Maaradactylus, showing outstretched wings

The arm bones supported and extended the wing. The humerus or upper arm bone is short but powerful. It has a large deltopectoral crest, to which the major flight muscles are attached. The humerus is hollow or pneumatised inside, reinforced by bone struts. The long bones of the lower arm, the ulna and radius, are much longer than the humerus. A bone unique to pterosaurs, the pteroid, supported the propatagium between the wrist and shoulder. The pterosaur wrist consists of two inner and four outer carpals. Two inner and three outer carpals are fused together into "syncarpals". The remaining outer carpal bears a deep concave fovea within which the pteroid articulates, according to Wilkinson.

In derived pterodactyloids metacarpals I-III are small and do not connect to the carpus, instead hanging in contact with the fourth metacarpal. In that case the fourth metacarpal has been enormously elongated, typically equalling or exceeding the length of the long bones of the lower arm. The fifth metacarpal had been lost. The first to third fingers are much smaller than the fourth, the "wingfinger", and contain two, three and four phalanges respectively. The smaller fingers are clawed. The wingfinger accounts for about half or more of the total wing length. It normally consists of four phalanges. Their relative lengths vary among species, allowing to distinguish related forms. The fourth phalanx is usually the shortest. It lacks a claw and has been lost completely by nyctosaurids. It is curved to behind, resulting in a rounded wing tip, which reduces induced drag. The wingfinger is also bent somewhat downwards. Standing, pterosaurs rested on their metacarpals, with the outer wing folded to behind. The "anterior" sides of the metacarpals were then rotated to the rear. This would point the smaller fingers obliquely to behind. According to Bennett, this would imply that the wingfinger, able to describe the largest arc of any wing element, up to 175°, was not folded by flexion but by an extreme extension. The wing was automatically folded when the elbow was bowed.

=== Hindlimbs ===
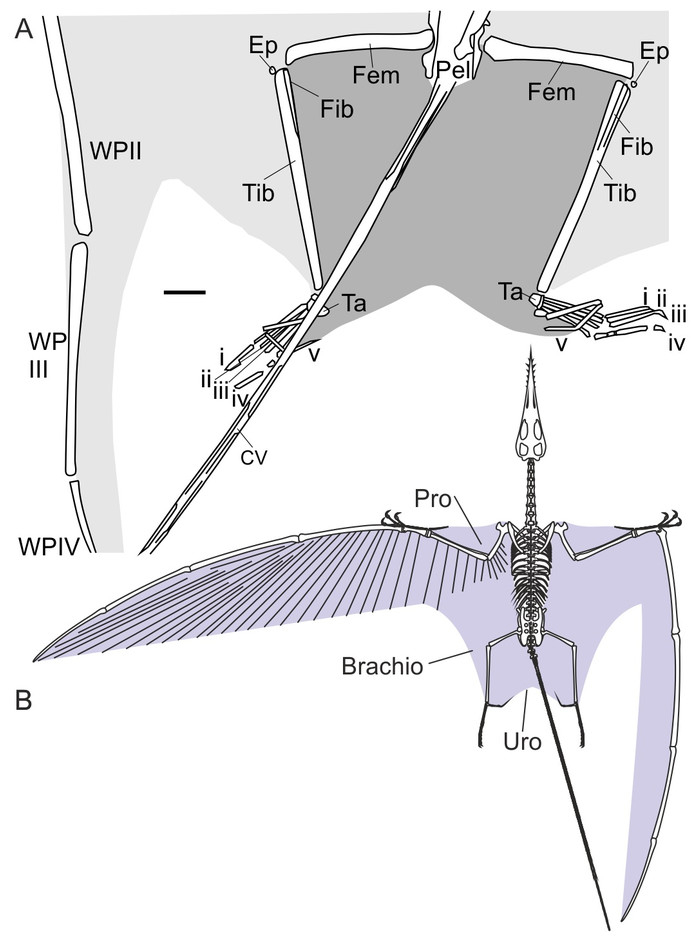
Diagram of hindlimb and uropatagium anatomy of early pterosaur Sordes (A), and in context of entire skeleton in related genus Rhamphorhynchus (B)

The hindlimbs of pterosaurs were strongly built, yet relative to their wingspans smaller than those of birds. They were long in comparison to the torso length. The thighbone was rather straight, with the head making only a small angle with the shaft. This implies that the legs were not held vertically below the body but were somewhat sprawling. The shinbone was often fused with the upper ankle bones into a tibiotarsus that was longer than the thighbone. It could attain a vertical position when walking. The calf bone tended to be slender, especially at its lower end that in advanced forms did not reach the ankle, sometimes reducing total length to a third. Typically, it was fused to the shinbone. The ankle was a simple, "mesotarsal", hinge. The, rather long and slender, metatarsus was always splayed to some degree. The foot was plantigrade, meaning that during the walking cycle the sole of the metatarsus was pressed onto the soil.

The first to fourth toes were long. They had two, three, four and five phalanges respectively. Often the third toe was longest; sometimes the fourth. Flat joints indicate a limited mobility. These toes were clawed but the claws were smaller than the hand claws. There was a clear difference between early pterosaurs and advanced species regarding the form of the fifth digit. Originally, the fifth metatarsal was robust and not very shortened. It was connected to the ankle in a higher position than the other metatarsals. It bore a long, and often curved, mobile clawless fifth toe consisting of two phalanges. It's thought that these toes support the uropatagium (or cruropatagium). As the fifth toes were on the outside of the feet, such a configuration would only have been possible if these rotated their fronts outwards in flight. Such a rotation could be caused by an abduction of the thighbone, meaning that the legs would be spread. This would also turn the feet into a vertical position. In more advanced pterosaurs, the fifth metatarsal was much reduced and the fifth toe, if present, little more than a stub.

=== Tail ===
The tail, a continuation of the vertebral column, was slender, incapable of powering the hindlimb. Early species had long tails of up to fifty vertebrae, stiffened by elongated zygapophyses and chevrons. They acted as rudders, ending at the rear in a vertical vane. In pterodactyloids, the tails were short and flexible, with as few as ten vertebrae.

=== Pycnofibers ===
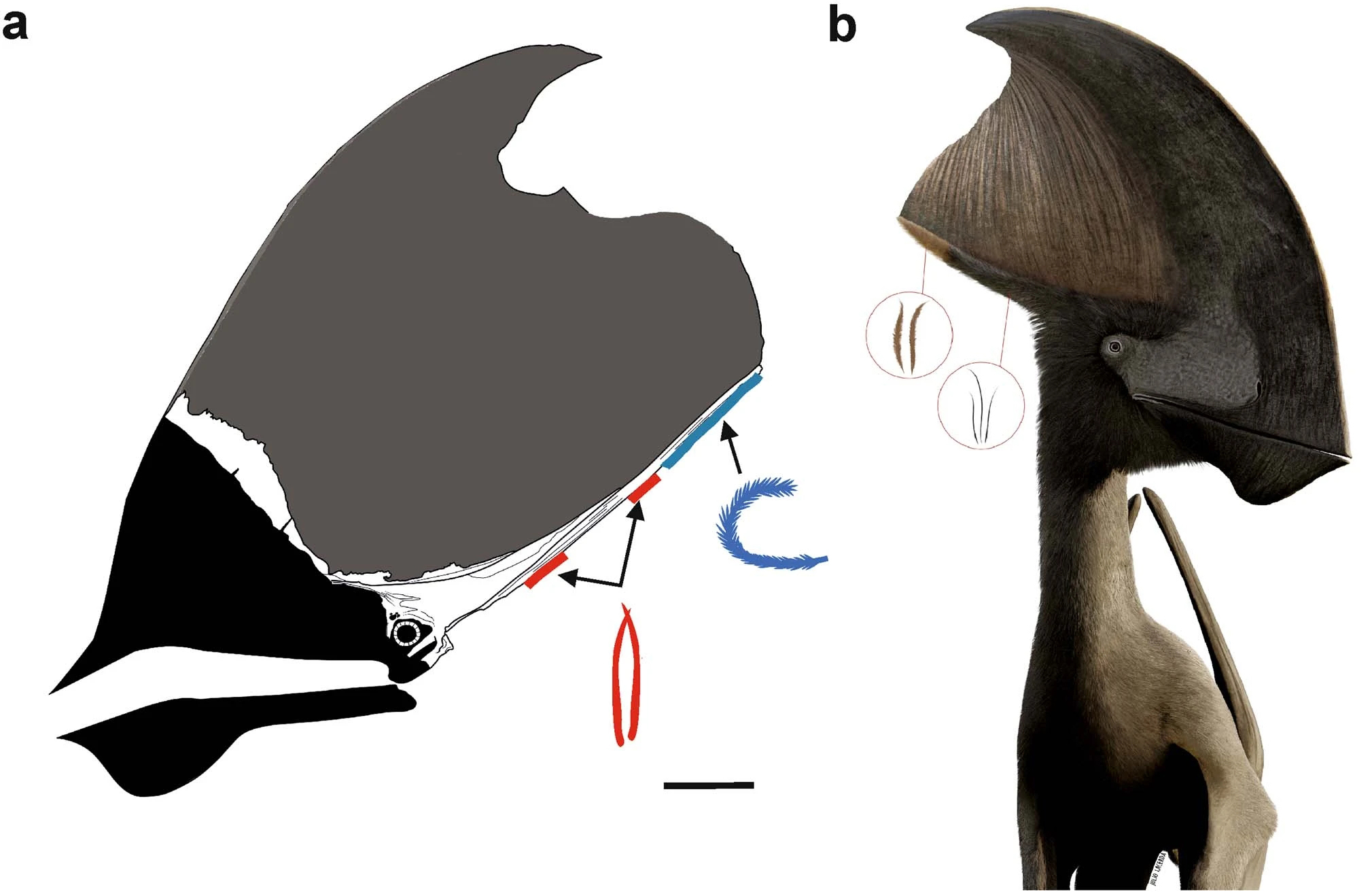
Diagram showing complex branched filaments in Tupandactylus, with a reconstruction at right showing thick pelt of pycnofibers

All pterosaurs had hair-like filaments known as pycnofibers on the head and torso. Pycnofibers were unique structures similar to mammalian hair, an example of convergent evolution, and pterosaur pelts might have been comparable in density to those of mammals Skin patches show small round non-overlapping scales on the soles of the hands and feet, but these were absent from the rest of the body. The pycnofibers show that pterosaurs were warm-blooded, providing insulation to prevent heat-loss.

Remains of two small Jurassic-age pterosaurs from Inner Mongolia, China, demonstrated that some pterosaurs had a wide array of pycnofiber shapes and structures, as opposed to the homogeneous structures that had previously documented. Some of these had frayed ends, very similar in structure to certain feather types known from birds or other dinosaurs. A well preserved fossil of Tupandactylus was found to have pigment cells with similar forms to those seen in modern birds, more complex in organisation than those previously known from other pterosaurs. This specimen also suggests the presence of Stage IIIa feathers, further indication of more complex filament structures in pterosaurs. Supporting a model of common ancestry with the filaments of birds, the authors termed these structures as pterosaur feathers rather than pycnofibers. This common origin had been suggested before, but remains controversial.

== History of discovery ==
=== First finds ===
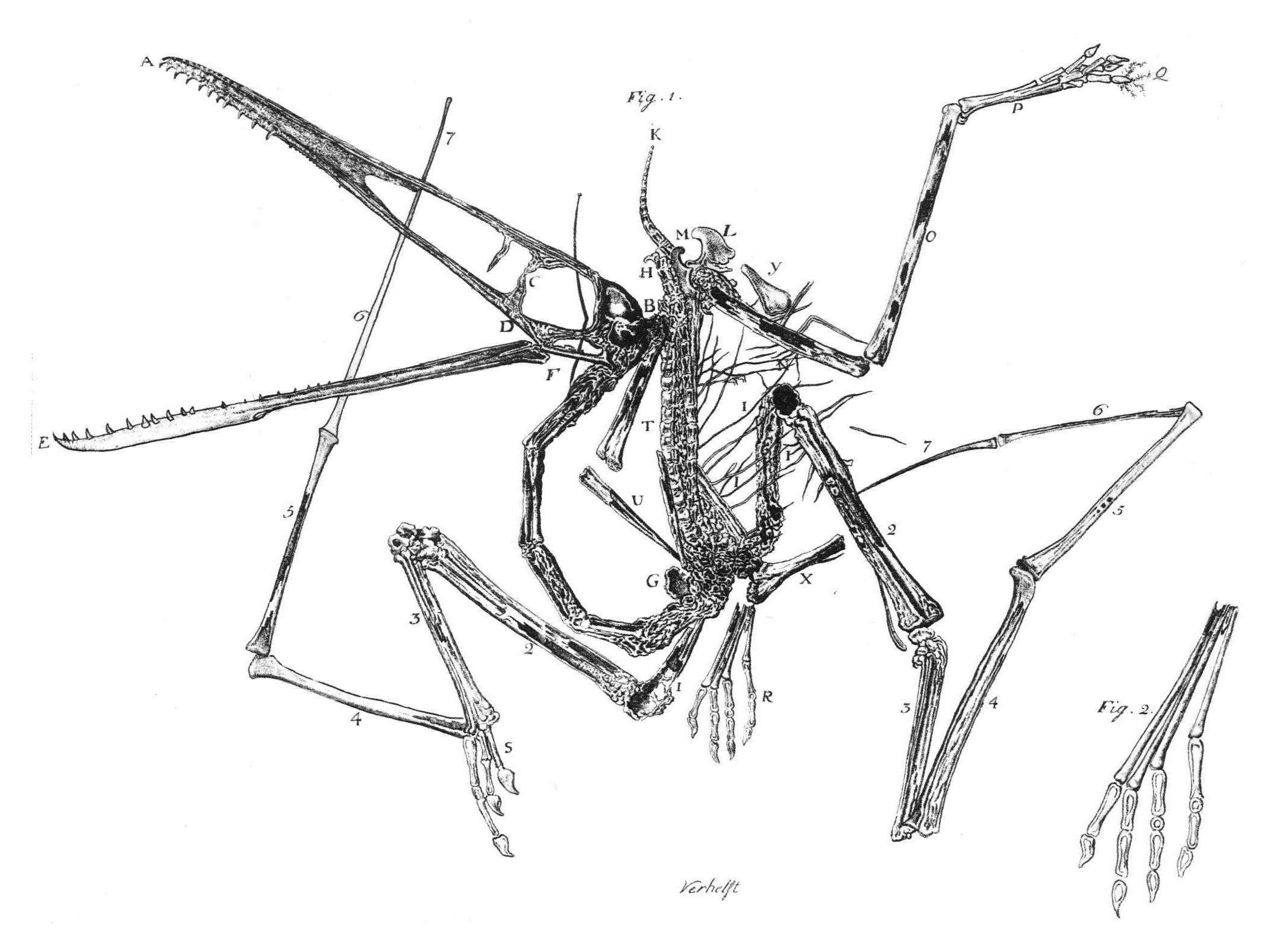
Engraving of the original Pterodactylus antiquus specimen by Egid Verhelst II, 1784

Pterosaur fossils are very rare, due to their light bone construction. Complete skeletons can generally only be found in geological layers with exceptional preservation conditions, the so-called Lagerstätten. The pieces from one such Lagerstätte, the Late Jurassic Solnhofen Limestone in Bavaria, became much sought after by rich collectors. In 1784, Italian naturalist Cosimo Alessandro Collini was the first scientist to describe a pterosaur fossil. At that time the concepts of evolution and extinction were imperfectly developed. The bizarre build of the pterosaur was shocking, as it could not clearly be assigned to any existing animal group. The discovery of pterosaurs would thus play an important role in the progress of modern paleontology and geology. Scientific opinion at the time was that if such creatures were still alive, only the sea was a credible habitat; Collini suggested it might be a swimming animal that used its long front limbs as paddles. A few scientists continued to support the aquatic interpretation even until 1830, when German zoologist Johann Georg Wagler suggested that Pterodactylus used its wings as flippers and was affiliated with Ichthyosauria and Plesiosauria.

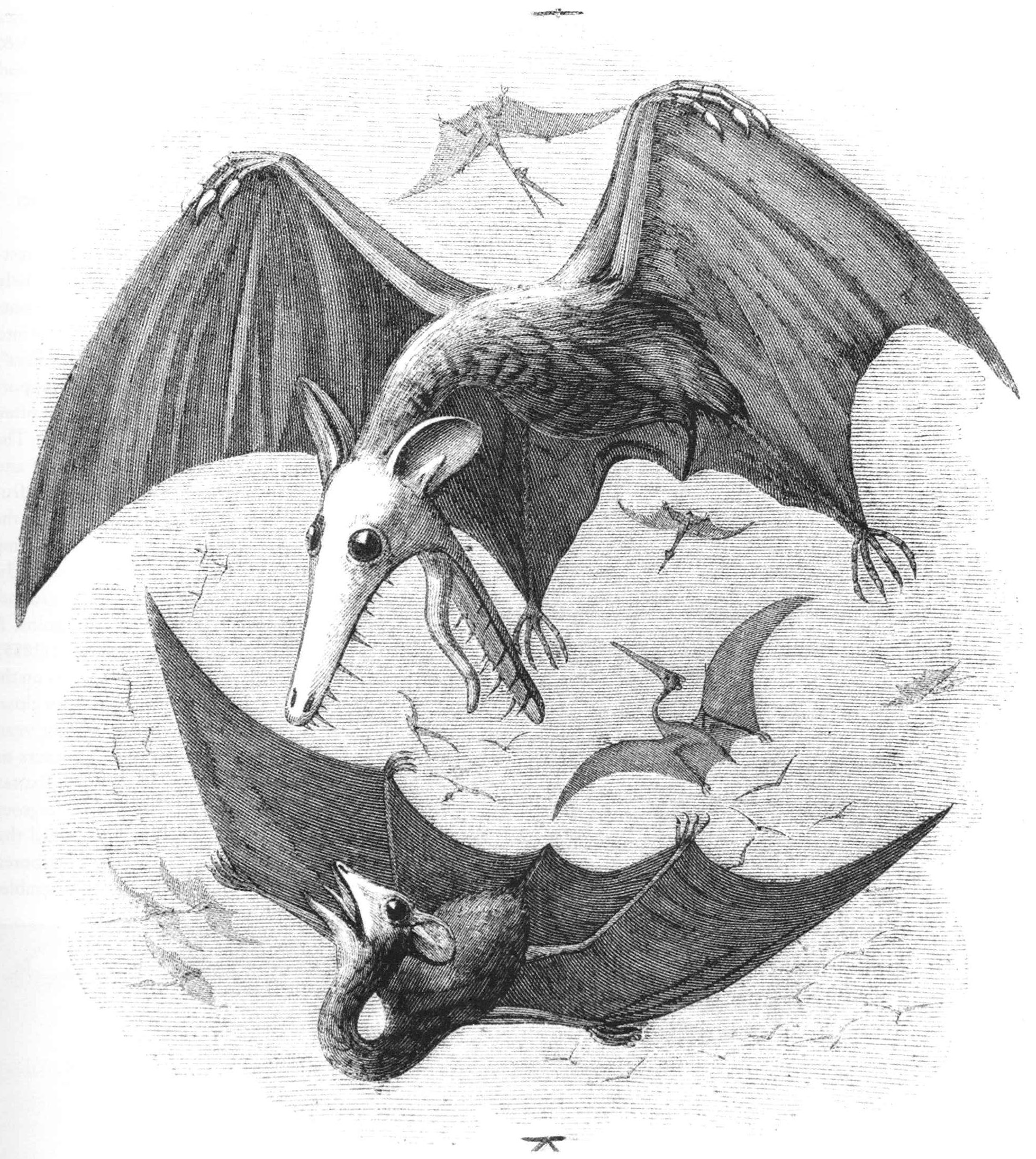
Newman's marsupial pterosaurs

In 1800, Johann Hermann first suggested that it represented a flying creature in a letter to Georges Cuvier. Cuvier agreed in 1801, understanding it was an extinct flying reptile. In 1809, he coined the name Ptéro-Dactyle, "wing-finger". This was in 1815 Latinised to Pterodactylus. At first most species were assigned to this genus and ultimately "pterodactyl" was popularly and incorrectly applied to all members of Pterosauria. Today, paleontologists limit the term to the genus Pterodactylus or members of the Pterodactyloidea.

In 1812 and 1817, Samuel Thomas von Soemmerring redescribed the original specimen and an additional one. He saw them as affiliated to birds and bats. Although he was mistaken in this, his "bat model" would be influential during the 19th century. In 1843, Edward Newman thought pterosaurs were flying marsupials. Ironically, as the "bat model" depicted pterosaurs as warm-blooded and furred, it would turn out to be more correct in certain aspects than Cuvier's "reptile model" in the long run. In 1834, Johann Jakob Kaup named an order "Pterosaurii" to contain the "Pterodactylii" (Pterodactylus) and suggested it probably consisted of several genera. Kaup has often been mentioned as the author of the name Pterosauria. The first to actually use the spelling Pterosauria was in 1841/1842 Richard Owen, referring Pterodactylus cuvieri (Cimoliopterus), Pterodactylus giganteus (Lonchodraco), Pterodactylus compressirostris (Lonchodectes) and Pterodactylus micronyx (Dimorphodon) to the order. Brian Andres and Timothy Myers have pointed out that Owen's description of Pterosauria as "reptiles that achieved flight by modification of their pectoral extremity" would be useful as a modern apomorphy-based clade definition.

=== Expanding research ===
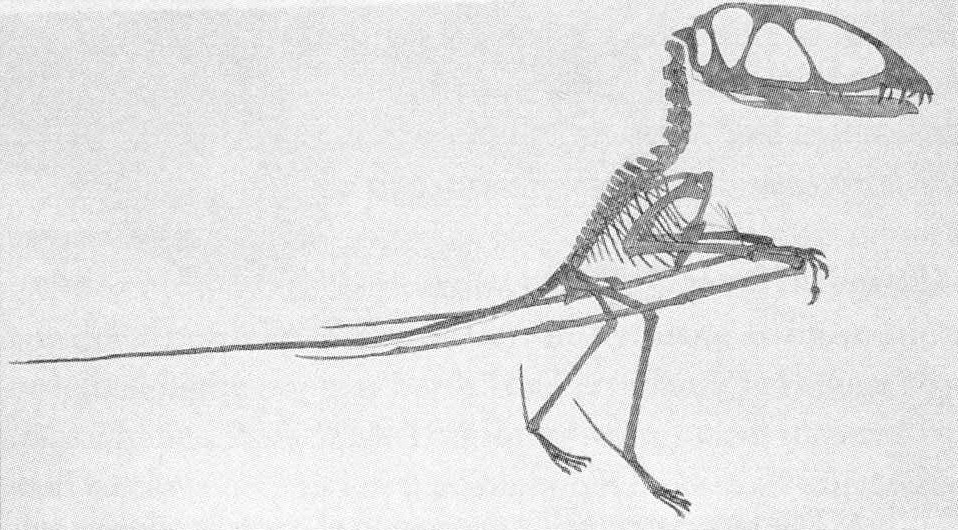
Historical reconstruction of Dimorphodon as a biped by Seeley

In 1828, Mary Anning found in England the first pterosaur genus outside Germany, named as Dimorphodon by Richard Owen, also the first non-pterodactyloid pterosaur known. Later in the century, the Early Cretaceous Cambridge Greensand produced thousands of pterosaur fossils, that however, were of poor quality, consisting mostly of strongly eroded fragments. Nevertheless, based on these, numerous genera and species would be named. Many were described by Harry Govier Seeley, at the time the main English expert on the subject, who also wrote the first pterosaur book, Ornithosauria, and in 1901 the first popular book, Dragons of the Air. Seeley thought that pterosaurs were warm-blooded and dynamic creatures, closely related to birds. Earlier, the evolutionist St. George Jackson Mivart had suggested pterosaurs were the direct ancestors of birds. Owen opposed the views of both men, seeing pterosaurs as cold-blooded "true" reptiles.

In the US, Othniel Charles Marsh in 1870 discovered Pteranodon in the Niobrara Chalk, then the largest known pterosaur, the first toothless one and the first from America. These layers too rendered thousands of fossils, also including relatively complete skeletons that were three-dimensionally preserved instead of being strongly compressed as with the Solnhofen specimens. This led to a much better understanding of many anatomical details, such as the hollow nature of the bones.

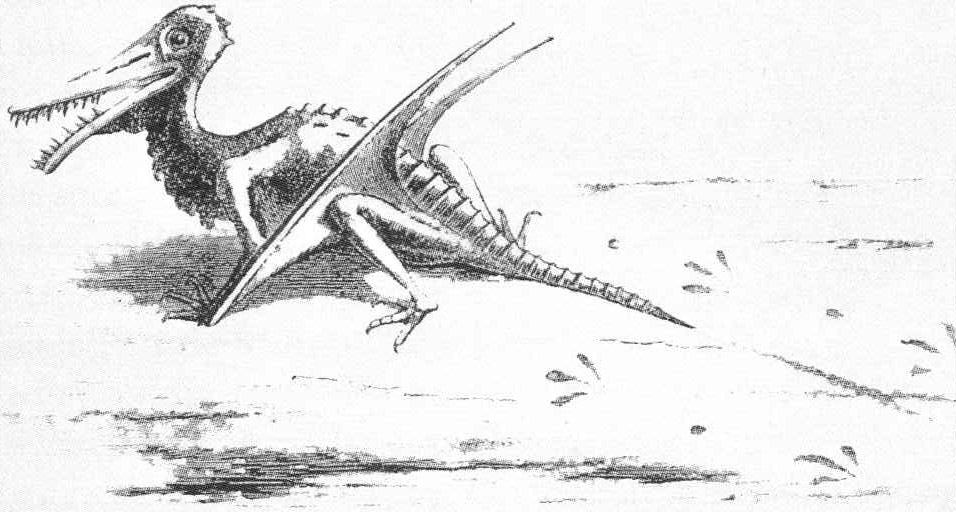
Early reconstruction of Rhamphorhynchus

Meanwhile, finds from the Solnhofen had continued, accounting for the majority of complete high-quality specimens discovered. They allowed to identify most new basal taxa, such as Rhamphorhynchus, Scaphognathus and Dorygnathus. This material gave birth to a German school of pterosaur research, which saw flying reptiles as the warm-blooded, furry and active Mesozoic counterparts of modern bats and birds. In 1882, Marsh and Karl Alfred Zittel published studies about the wing membranes of specimens of Rhamphorhynchus. German studies continued well into the 1930s, describing new species such as Anurognathus. In 1927, Ferdinand Broili discovered hair follicles in pterosaur skin, and paleoneurologist Tilly Edinger determined that the brains of pterosaurs more resembled those of birds than modern cold-blooded reptiles.

In contrast, English and American paleontologists by the middle of the twentieth century largely lost interest in pterosaurs. They saw them as failed evolutionary experiments, cold-blooded and scaly, that hardly could fly, the larger species only able to glide, being forced to climb trees or throw themselves from cliffs to achieve a take-off. In 1914, for the first-time pterosaur aerodynamics were quantitatively analysed, by Ernest Hanbury Hankin and David Meredith Seares Watson, but they interpreted Pteranodon as a pure glider. Little research was done on the group during the 1940s and 1950s.

=== Pterosaur renaissance ===
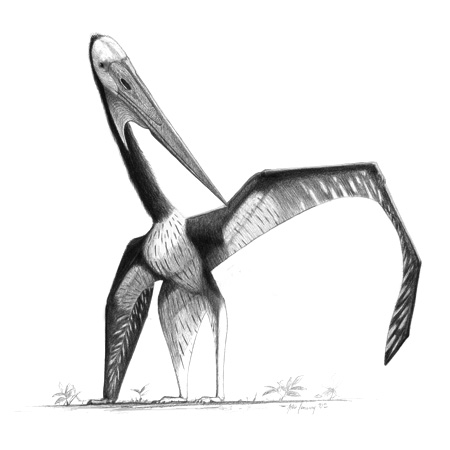
This drawing of Zhejiangopterus by John Conway exemplifies the "new look" of pterosaurs

The situation for dinosaurs was comparable. From the 1960s onwards, a dinosaur renaissance took place, a quick increase in the number of studies and critical ideas, influenced by the discovery of additional fossils of Deinonychus, whose spectacular traits refuted what had become entrenched orthodoxy. In 1970, likewise the description of the furry pterosaur Sordes began what Robert Bakker named a renaissance of pterosaurs. Kevin Padian especially propagated the new views, publishing a series of studies depicting pterosaurs as warm-blooded, active and running animals. This coincided with a revival of the German school through the work of Peter Wellnhofer, who in 1970s laid the foundations of modern pterosaur science. In 1978, he published the first pterosaur textbook, the Handbuch der Paläoherptologie, Teil 19: Pterosauria, and in 1991 the second ever popular science pterosaur book, the Encyclopedia of Pterosaurs.

This development accelerated through the exploitation of two new Lagerstätten. During the 1970s, the Early Cretaceous Santana Formation in Brazil began to produce chalk nodules that, though often limited in size and the completeness of the fossils they contained, perfectly preserved three-dimensional pterosaur skeletal parts. German and Dutch institutes bought such nodules from fossil poachers and prepared them in Europe, allowing their scientists to describe many new species and revealing a whole new fauna. Soon, Brazilian researchers, among them Alexander Kellner, intercepted the trade and named even more species.

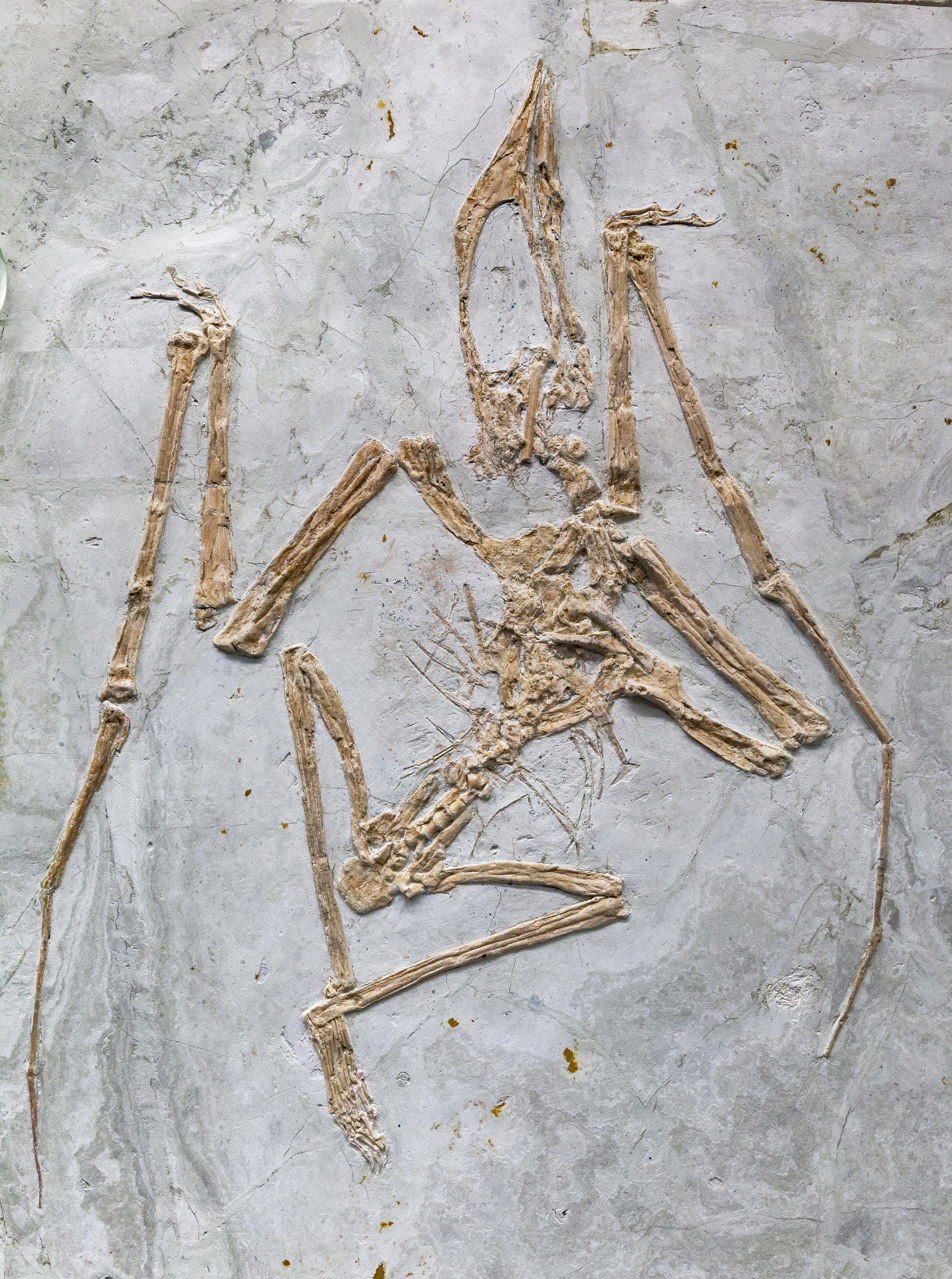
Specimen of Sinopterus, one of many excellent pterosaur fossils from Liaoning, China

Even more productive was the Early Cretaceous Chinese Jehol Biota of Liaoning that since the 1990s has brought forth hundreds of exquisitely preserved two-dimensional fossils, often showing soft tissue remains. Chinese researchers such as Lü Junchang have again named many new taxa. As discoveries also increased in other parts of the world, a sudden surge in the total of named genera took place. By 2009, when they had increased to about ninety, this growth showed no sign of levelling-off. In 2013, M.P. Witton indicated that the number of discovered pterosaur species had risen to 130. Over ninety percent of known taxa has been named during the "renaissance". Many of these were from groups the existence of which had been unknown. Advances in computing power enabled researchers to determine their complex relationships through the quantitative method of cladistics. New and old fossils yielded much more information when subjected to modern ultraviolet light or roentgen photography, or CAT-scans. Insights from other fields of biology were applied to the data obtained. All this resulted in a substantial progress in pterosaur research, rendering older accounts in popular science books completely outdated.

In 2017 a fossil from a 170-million-year-old pterosaur, later named as the species Dearc sgiathanach in 2022, was discovered on the Isle of Skye in Scotland. The National Museum of Scotland claims that it is the largest of its kind ever discovered from the Jurassic period, and it has been described as the world's best-preserved skeleton of a pterosaur.

== Evolution and extinction ==
=== Origins ===
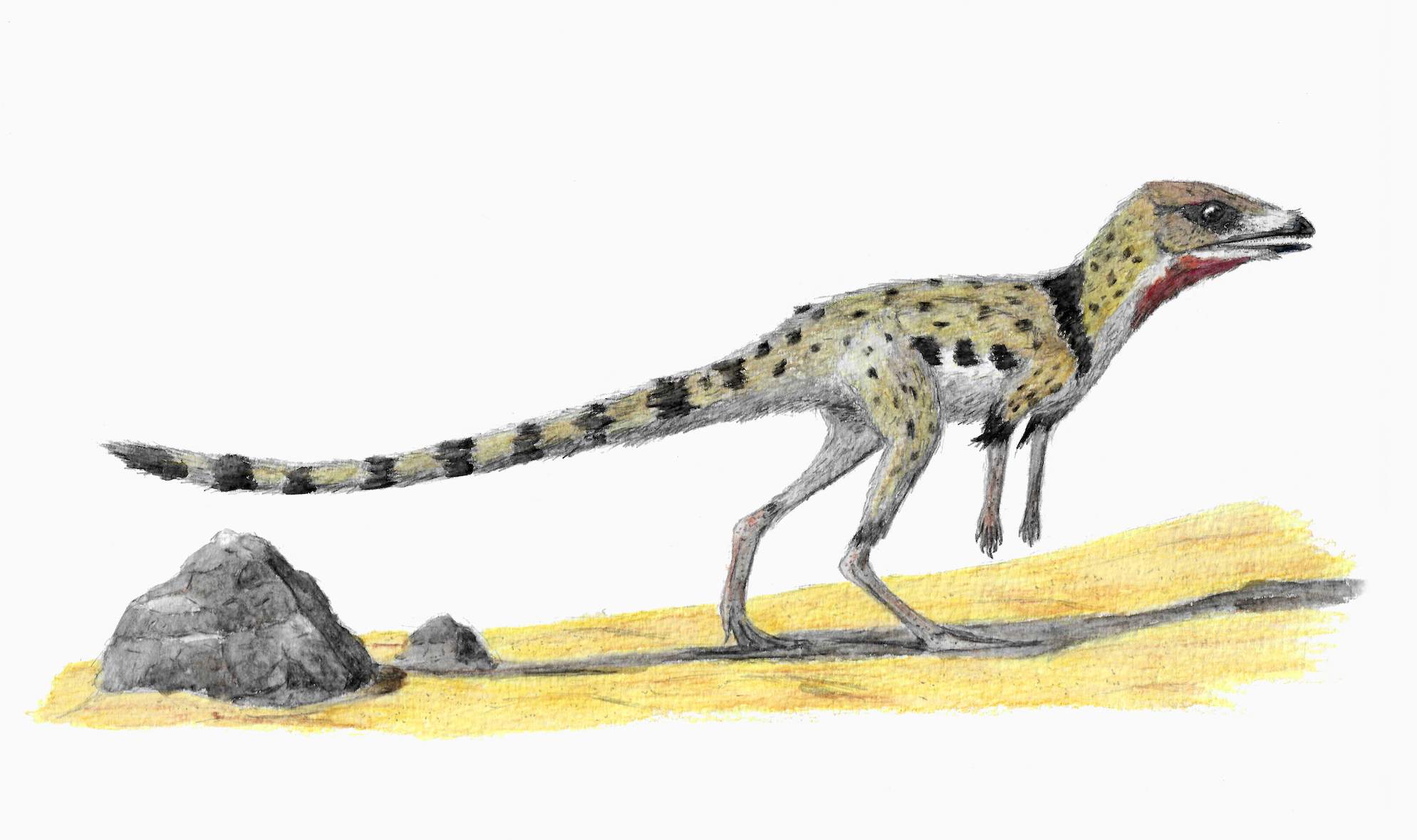
Life restoration of Scleromochlus, an archosauromorph theorized to be related to pterosaurs.

Because pterosaur anatomy has been so heavily modified for flight, and immediate transitional fossil predecessors have not so far been described, the ancestry of pterosaurs is not fully understood. The oldest known pterosaurs were already fully adapted to a flying lifestyle. Since Seeley, it was recognised that pterosaurs were likely to have had their origin in the "archosaurs", what today would be called the Archosauromorpha. In the 1980s, early cladistic analyses found that they were Avemetatarsalians (archosaurs closer to dinosaurs than to crocodilians). As this would make them also rather close relatives of the dinosaurs, these results were seen by Kevin Padian as confirming his interpretation of pterosaurs as bipedal warm-blooded animals. Because these early analyses were based on a limited number of taxa and characters, their results were inherently uncertain.

Several influential researchers who rejected Padian's conclusions offered alternative hypotheses. David Unwin proposed an ancestry among the basal Archosauromorpha, specifically long-necked forms ("protorosaurs") such as tanystropheids. A placement among basal archosauriforms like Euparkeria was also suggested. Basal archosauromorphs such as these seemed to be good candidates for close pterosaur relatives due to their long-limbed anatomy; especially notable is Sharovipteryx, which possessed skin membranes on its hindlimbs likely used for gliding. A 1999 study by Michael Benton reinforced that pterosaurs were avemetatarsalians closely related to Scleromochlus, and named the group Ornithodira to encompass pterosaurs and dinosaurs. In 1996, research S. Christopher Bennett published an analysis finding pterosaurs to be protorosaurs or closely related to them after removing characteristics of the hindlimb from his analysis, to test the possibility of locomotion-based convergent evolution between pterosaurs and dinosaurs. A 2007 reply by Dave Hone and Michael Benton could not reproduce this result, finding pterosaurs to be closely related to dinosaurs even without hindlimb characters. They concluded that, although more basal pterosauromorphs are needed to clarify their relationships, current evidence indicates that pterosaurs are avemetatarsalians, as either the sister group of Scleromochlus or a branch between the latter and Lagosuchus.

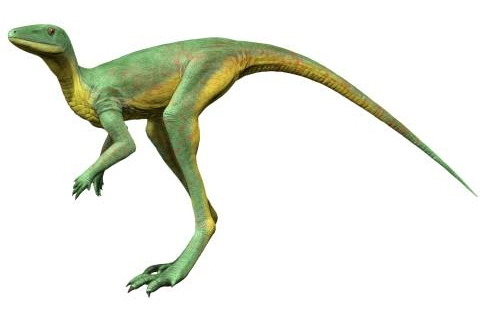
Life restoration of Lagerpeton. Lagerpetids share many anatomical and neuroanatomical similarities with pterosaurs and may be close relatives

A 2011 archosaur-focused phylogenetic analysis by Sterling Nesbitt benefited from far more data and found strong support for pterosaurs being avemetatarsalians, though Scleromochlus was not included due to its poor preservation. A 2016 archosauromorph-focused study by Martin Ezcurra included various proposed pterosaur relatives, yet also found pterosaurs to be closer to dinosaurs and unrelated to more basal taxa. Working from his 1996 analysis, Bennett published a 2020 study on Scleromochlus which argued that both Scleromochlus and pterosaurs were non-archosaur archosauromorphs, albeit not particularly closely related to each other. By contrast, a later 2020 study proposed that lagerpetid archosaurs were the sister clade to pterosauria. This was based on newly described fossil skulls and forelimbs showing various anatomical similarities with pterosaurs and reconstructions of lagerpetid brains and sensory systems based on CT scans also showing neuroanatomical similarities with pterosaurs. The results of the latter study were subsequently supported by an independent analysis of early pterosauromorph interrelationships.

A related problem is the origin of pterosaur flight. Like with birds, hypotheses can be ordered into two main varieties: "ground up" or "tree down". Climbing a tree would cause height and gravity to provide both the energy and a strong selection pressure for incipient flight, as a fall could kill a climbing animal. Rupert Wild in 1983 proposed a hypothetical "propterosaurus": a lizard-like arboreal animal developing a membrane between its limbs, first to safely parachute and then, gradually elongating the fourth finger, to glide. However, subsequent cladistic results did not fit this model well. Neither protorosaurs nor ornithodirans are biologically equivalent to lizards. Furthermore, the transition between gliding and flapping flight is not well-understood. More recent studies on basal pterosaur hindlimb morphology seem to vindicate a connection to Scleromochlus. Like this archosaur, basal pterosaur lineages have plantigrade hindlimbs that show adaptations for saltation.

At least one study found that the early Triassic ichnofossil Prorotodactylus is anatomically similar to that of early pterosaurs.

=== Extinction ===
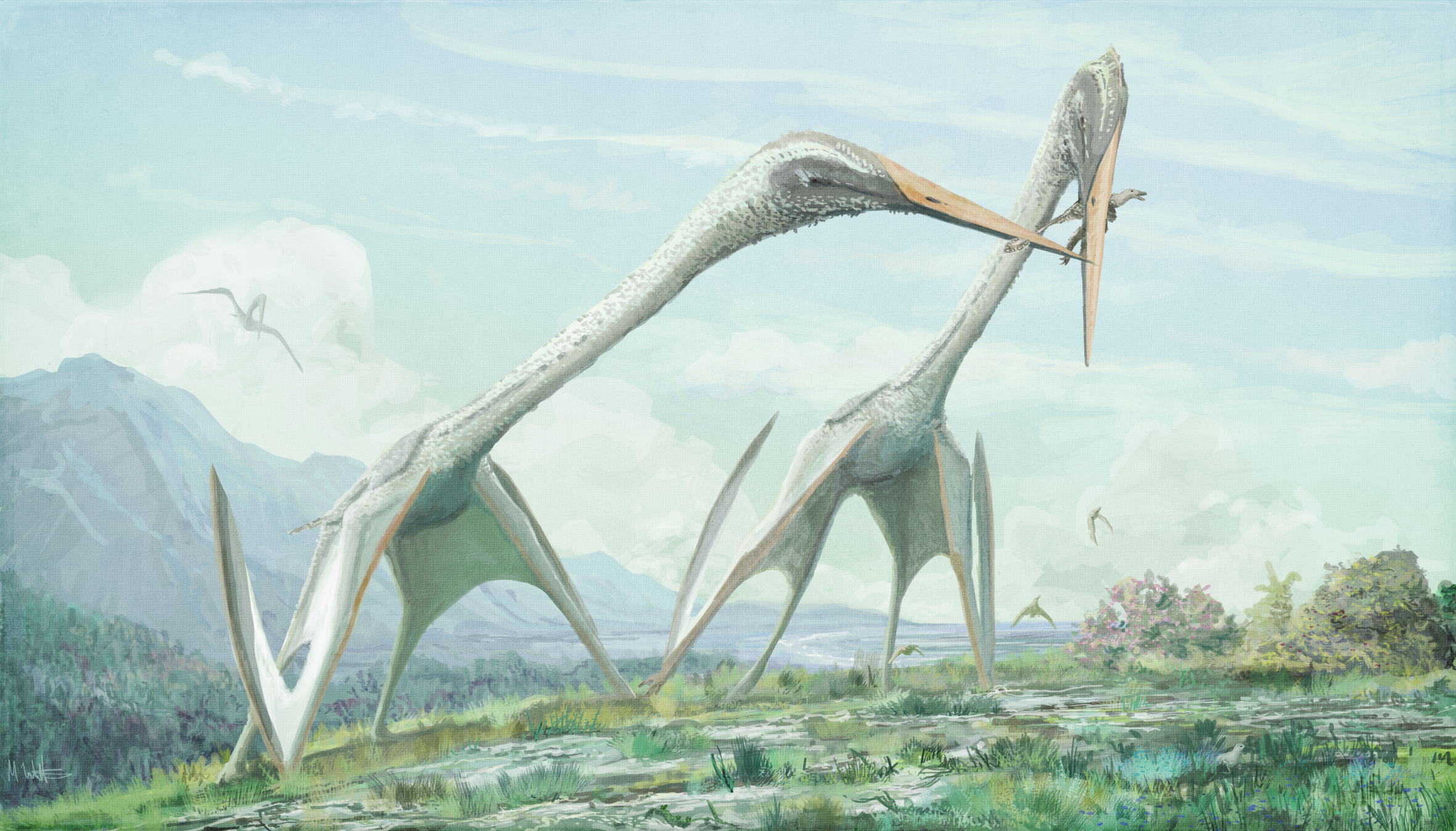
Azhdarchid pterosaurs such as Arambourgiana thrived at the end of the Cretaceous

It was once assumed that competition with early bird species resulted in the extinction of many of the pterosaurs. It was thought that by the end of the Cretaceous, only very large species of pterosaurs were present. The smaller species were presumed to have become extinct, their niche filled by birds. However, pterosaur decline (if actually occurring) seems unrelated to bird diversity, as ecological overlap between the two groups appears to be minimal. In fact, at least some avian niches were reclaimed by pterosaurs prior to the Cretaceous–Paleogene extinction event. It seems that this K-Pg extinction event at the end of the Cretaceous, which wiped out all non-avian dinosaurs and many other animals, was the direct cause of the extinction of the pterosaurs.

Small-sized pterosaur species apparently were present in the Csehbánya Formation, indicating a higher diversity of Late Cretaceous pterosaurs than previously accounted for. The recent findings of a small cat-sized adult azhdarchid further indicate that small pterosaurs from the Late Cretaceous might actually have simply been rarely preserved in the fossil record, helped by the fact that there is a strong bias against terrestrial small sized vertebrates such as juvenile dinosaurs, and that their diversity might actually have been much larger than previously thought.

A 2021 study showcases that niches previously occupied by small pterosaurs were increasingly occupied by the juvenile stages of larger species in the Late Cretaceous, indicating that pterosaurs continued to be successful as small flying animals even in the presence of avians. Rather than being outcompeted by birds, pterosaurs essentially specialised, a trend already occurring in previous eras of the Mesozoic.

== Classification and phylogeny ==
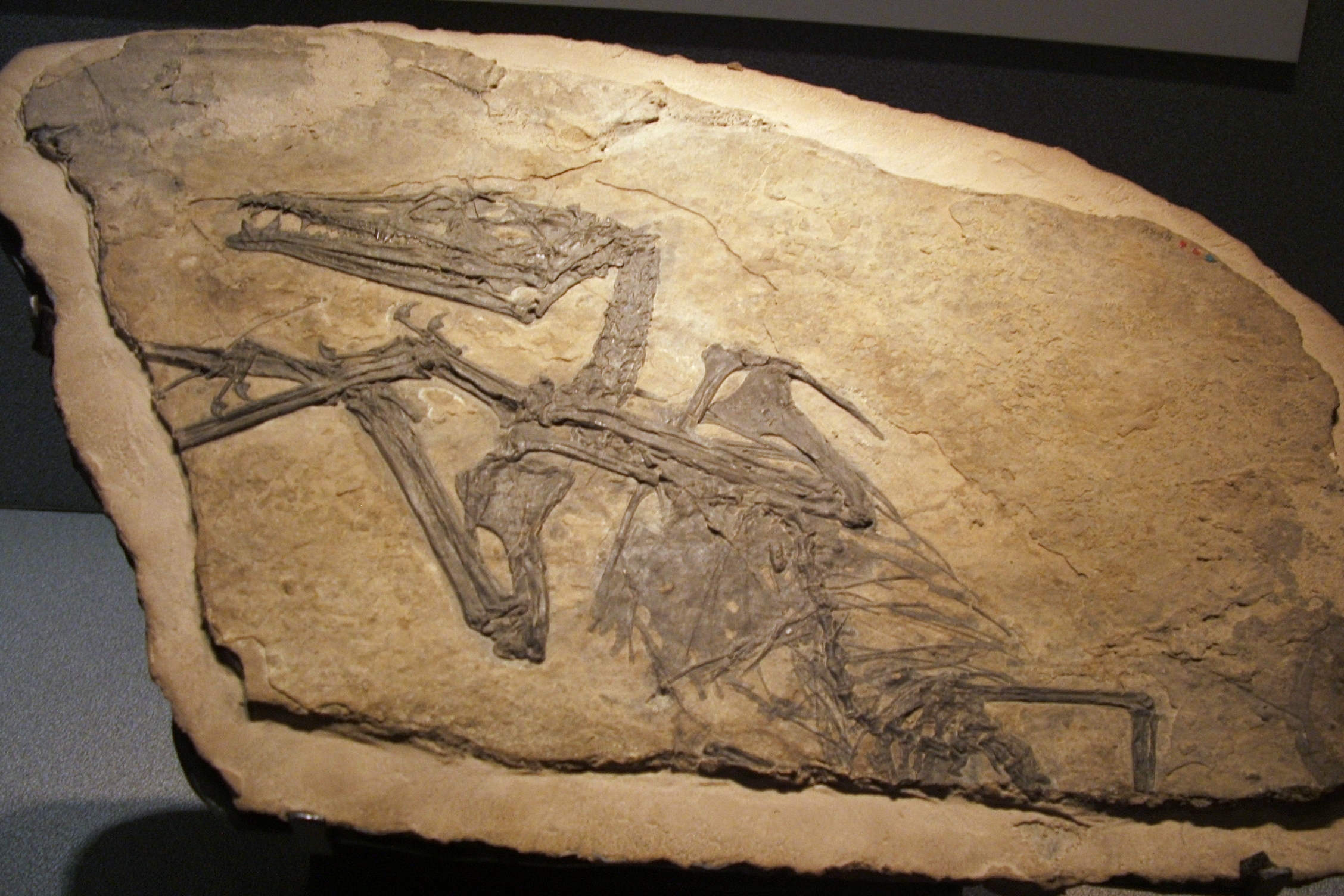
Fossil of Eudimorphodon, one of the most primitive pterosaurs

In phylogenetic taxonomy, the clade Pterosauria has usually been defined as node-based and anchored to several extensively studied taxa as well as those thought to be primitive. One 2003 study defined Pterosauria as "The most recent common ancestor of the Anurognathidae, Preondactylus and Quetzalcoatlus and all their descendants." However, these types of definition would inevitably leave any related species that are slightly more primitive out of the Pterosauria. To remedy this, a new definition was proposed that would anchor the name not to any particular species but to an anatomical feature, the presence of an enlarged fourth finger that supports a wing membrane. This apomorphy-based definition was adopted by the PhyloCode in 2020 as "[T]he clade characterized by the apomorphy fourth manual digit hypertrophied to support a wing membrane, as inherited by Pterodactylus (originally Ornithocephalus) antiquus (Sömmerring 1812)". A broader clade, Pterosauromorpha, has been defined as all ornithodirans more closely related to pterosaurs than to dinosaurs.

The internal classification of pterosaurs has historically been difficult, because there were many gaps in the fossil record. Starting from the 21st century, new discoveries are now filling in these gaps and giving a better picture of the evolution of pterosaurs. Traditionally, they were organized into two suborders: the Rhamphorhynchoidea, a "primitive" group of long-tailed pterosaurs, and the Pterodactyloidea, "advanced" pterosaurs with short tails. However, this traditional division has been largely abandoned. Rhamphorhynchoidea is a paraphyletic (unnatural) group, since the pterodactyloids evolved directly from them and not from a common ancestor, so, with the increasing use of cladistics, it has fallen out of favor among most scientists.

Within pterosaurs, several smaller clades have been named. The clade Novialoidea was named by paleontologist Alexander Wilhelm Armin Kellner in 2003 as a node-based taxon consisting of the last common ancestor of Campylognathoides, Quetzalcoatlus and all its descendants. This name was derived from Latin novus "new", and ala, "wing", in reference to the wing synapomorphies that the members of the clade possess.

Paleontologist David Unwin in 2003 had named the group Lonchognatha in the same issue of the journal that published Novialoidea (Geological Society of London, Special Publications 217) and defined it as Eudimorphodon ranzii, Rhamphorhynchus muensteri, their most recent common ancestor and all its descendants (as a node-based taxon). Under Unwin's and Kellner's phylogenetic analyses (where Eudimorphodon and Campylognathoides form a group that is basal to both Rhamphorhynchus and Quetzalcoatlus), Novialoidea is materially identical to Lonchognatha. However, other analyses find Lonchognatha to be a separate concept (Andres et al., 2010), or synonymous with the Pterosauria (Andres, 2010).

The precise relationships between pterosaurs is still unsettled. Many studies of pterosaur relationships in the past have included limited data and were highly contradictory. However, newer studies using larger data sets are beginning to make things clearer. The cladogram (family tree) below follows a phylogenetic analysis presented by Longrich, Martill and Andres in 2018, with clade names after Andres et al. (2014).

- Pterosauria
  - Eopterosauria
  - Macronychoptera
    - Dimorphodontia
    - - Campylognathoididae
      - - Rhamphorhynchidae
        - - Sordes
          - - Darwinoptera
            - - Changchengopterus
              - - Anurognathidae
                - Pterodactyloidea
                  - Kryptodrakon
                  - Lophocratia
                    - Archaeopterodactyloidea
                      - Germanodactylidae
                      - Euctenochasmatia
                        - Pterodactylus
                        - Ctenochasmatoidea
                    - Eupterodactyloidea
                      - Haopterus
                      - Ornithocheiroidea
                        - Azhdarchoidea
                          - Tapejaromorpha
                          - Neoazhdarchia
                        - - Piksi
                          - Pteranodontoidea
                            - Pteranodontia
                            - Ornithocheiromorpha

The position of the clade Anurognathidae (Anurognathus, Jeholopterus, Vesperopterylus) is debated. Anurognathids were highly specialized, small flyers with shortened jaws and a wide gape. Some had large eyes suggesting nocturnal or crepuscular habits, mouth bristles, and feet adapted for clinging. Parallel adaptations are seen in birds and bats that prey on insects in flight.

== Paleobiology ==
=== Flight ===
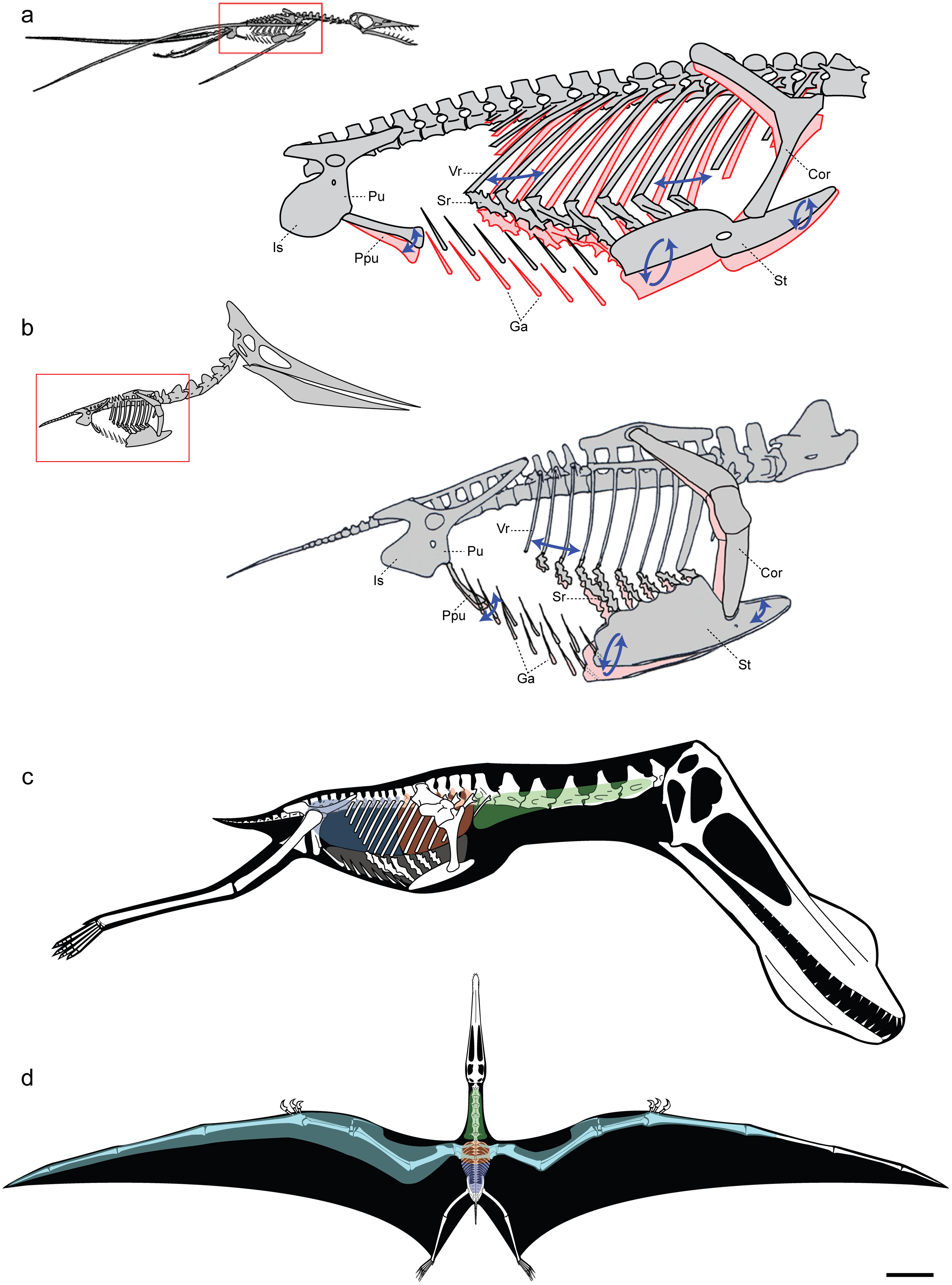
Diagrams showing breathing motion (top two) and internal air sac system (bottom two)

The mechanics of pterosaur flight are not completely understood or modelled as of 2008.

Katsufumi Sato, a Japanese scientist, did calculations using modern birds and concluded that it was impossible for a pterosaur to stay aloft. In the book Posture, Locomotion, and Paleoecology of Pterosaurs it is theorised that they were able to fly due to the oxygen-rich, dense atmosphere of the Late Cretaceous period. However, both Sato and the authors of Posture, Locomotion, and Paleoecology of Pterosaurs based their research on the now-outdated theories of pterosaurs being seabird-like, and the size limit does not apply to terrestrial pterosaurs, such as azhdarchids and tapejarids. Furthermore, Darren Naish concluded that atmospheric differences between the present and the Mesozoic were not needed for the giant size of pterosaurs.

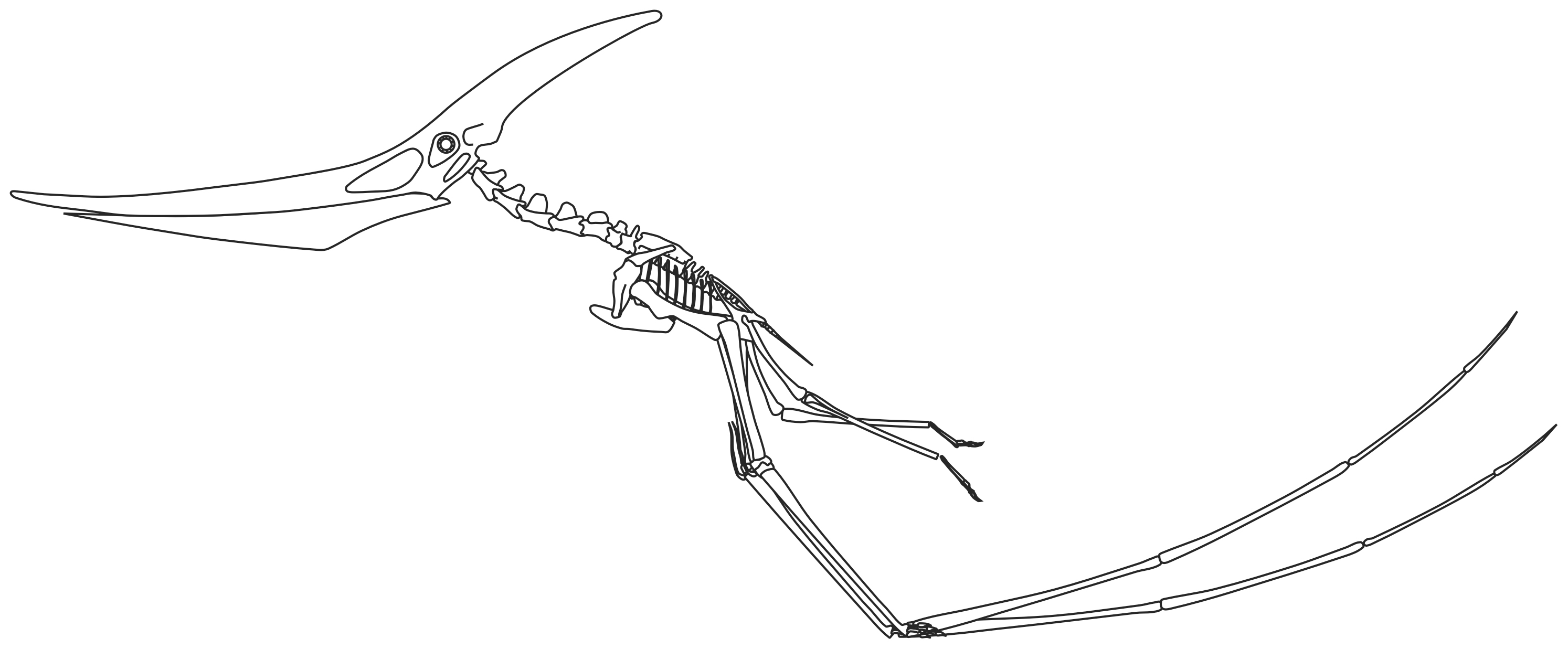
Skeletal reconstruction of a quadrupedally launching Pteranodon longiceps

Another issue that has been difficult to understand is how they took off. Earlier suggestions were that pterosaurs were largely cold-blooded gliding animals, deriving warmth from the environment like modern lizards, rather than burning calories. In this case, it was unclear how the larger ones of enormous size, with an inefficient cold-blooded metabolism, could manage a bird-like takeoff strategy, using only the hind limbs to generate thrust for getting airborne. Later research shows them instead as being warm-blooded and having powerful flight muscles, and using the flight muscles for walking as quadrupeds. Mark Witton of the University of Portsmouth and Mike Habib of Johns Hopkins University suggested that pterosaurs used a vaulting mechanism to obtain flight. The tremendous power of their winged forelimbs would enable them to take off with ease. Once aloft, pterosaurs could reach speeds of up to 120 km/h (75 mph) and travel thousands of kilometres.

In 1985, the Smithsonian Institution commissioned aeronautical engineer Paul MacCready to build a half-scale working model of Quetzalcoatlus northropi. The replica was launched with a ground-based winch. It flew several times in 1986 and was filmed as part of the Smithsonian's IMAX film On the Wing.

Large-headed species are thought to have forwardly swept their wings in order to better balance.

=== Air sacs and respiration ===
A 2009 study showed that pterosaurs had a lung-and-air-sac system and a precisely controlled skeletal breathing pump, which supports a flow-through pulmonary ventilation model in pterosaurs, analogous to that of birds. The presence of a subcutaneous air sac system in at least some pterodactyloids would have further reduced the density of the living animal. Like modern crocodilians, pterosaurs are sometimes hypothesized to have had a hepatic piston, seeing as their shoulder-pectoral girdles were too inflexible to move the sternum as in birds, and they possessed a smooth thoracic ceiling posteriorly along their ribcage and strong gastralia, features consistent with the ability to inflate and deflate the lungs with craniocaudal movements as seen in a hepatic piston. This mechanism, however, has the obvious problem of constantly shifting the animal's centre of mass back and forth while it breathes, which would make flying highly unstable, rendering the mechanism highly unlikely. Nevertheless, it does not rule out alternative forms of extra-costal modes of ventilation, especially ones that would shift the centre of mass up and down instead of back and forth, similar to birds, as it makes flying much more stable. Thus, their respiratory system had characteristics comparable to both modern archosaur clades.

=== Nervous system ===
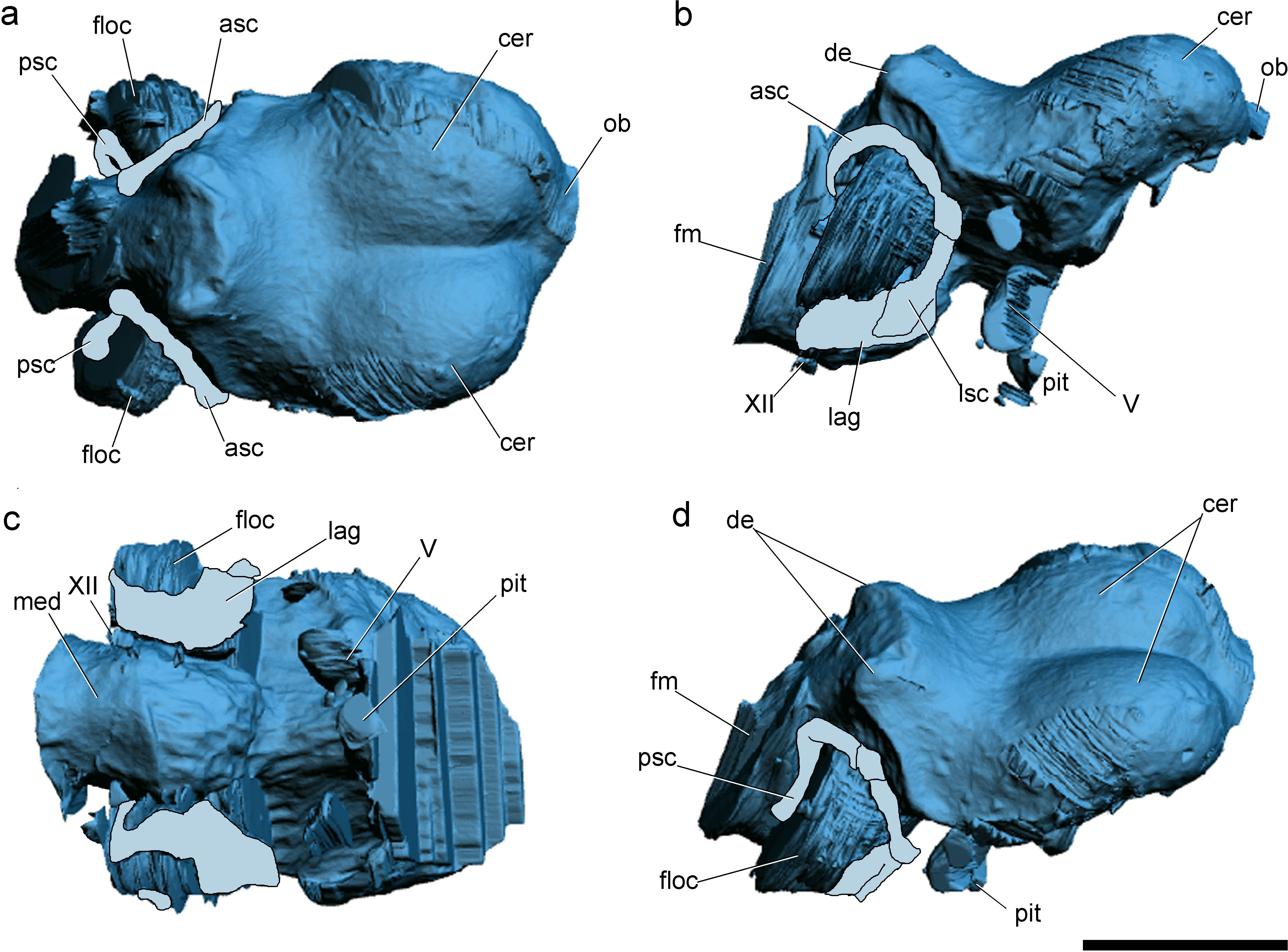
Brain endocast of Allkaruen

An X-ray study of pterosaur brain cavities revealed that the animals (Rhamphorhynchus muensteri and Anhanguera santanae) had massive flocculi. The flocculus is a brain region that integrates signals from joints, muscles, skin and balance organs. The pterosaurs' flocculi occupied 7.5% of the animals' total brain mass, more than in any other vertebrate. Birds have unusually large flocculi compared with other animals, but these only occupy between 1 and 2% of total brain mass.

The flocculus sends out neural signals that produce small, automatic movements in the eye muscles. These keep the image on an animal's retina steady. Pterosaurs may have had such a large flocculus because of their large wing size, which would mean that there was a great deal more sensory information to process. The low relative mass of the flocculi in birds is also a result of birds having a much larger brain overall; though this has been considered an indication that pterosaurs lived in a structurally simpler environment or had less complex behaviour compared to birds, recent studies of crocodilians and other reptiles show that it is common for sauropsids to achieve high intelligence levels with small brains. Studies on the endocast of Allkaruen show that brain evolution in pterodactyloids was a modular process.

=== Terrestrial locomotion ===
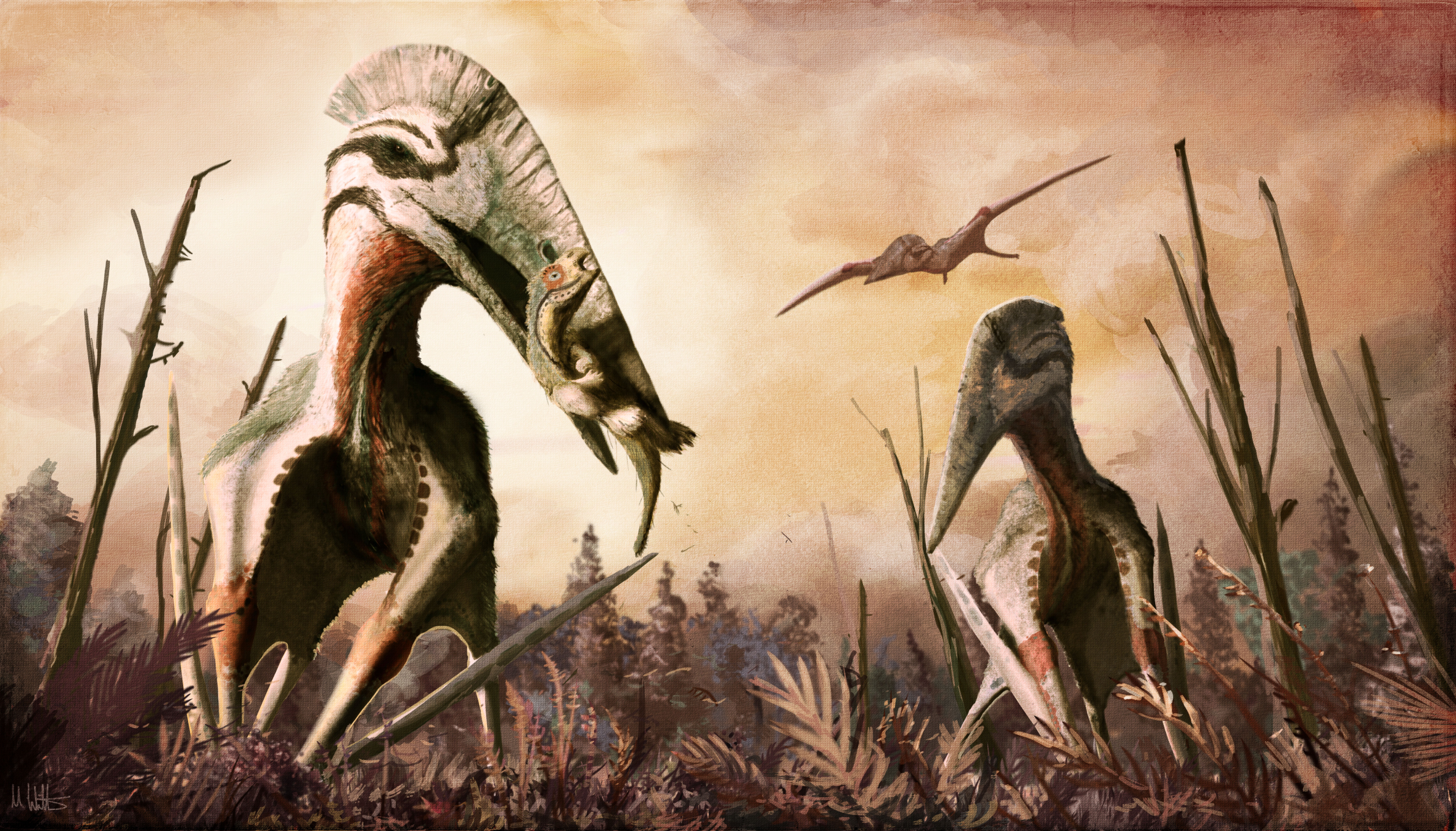
The fossil trackways show that pterosaurs like Hatzegopteryx were quadrupeds, and some rather efficient terrestrial predators.

Pterosaurs' hip sockets are oriented facing slightly upwards, and the head of the femur (thigh bone) is only moderately inward facing, suggesting that pterosaurs had an erect stance. It would have been possible to lift the thigh into a horizontal position during flight, as gliding lizards do.

There was considerable debate whether pterosaurs ambulated as quadrupeds or as bipeds. In the 1980s, paleontologist Kevin Padian suggested that smaller pterosaurs with longer hindlimbs, such as Dimorphodon, might have walked or even run bipedally, in addition to flying, like road runners. However, a large number of pterosaur trackways were later found with a distinctive four-toed hind foot and three-toed front foot; these are the unmistakable prints of pterosaurs walking on all fours.

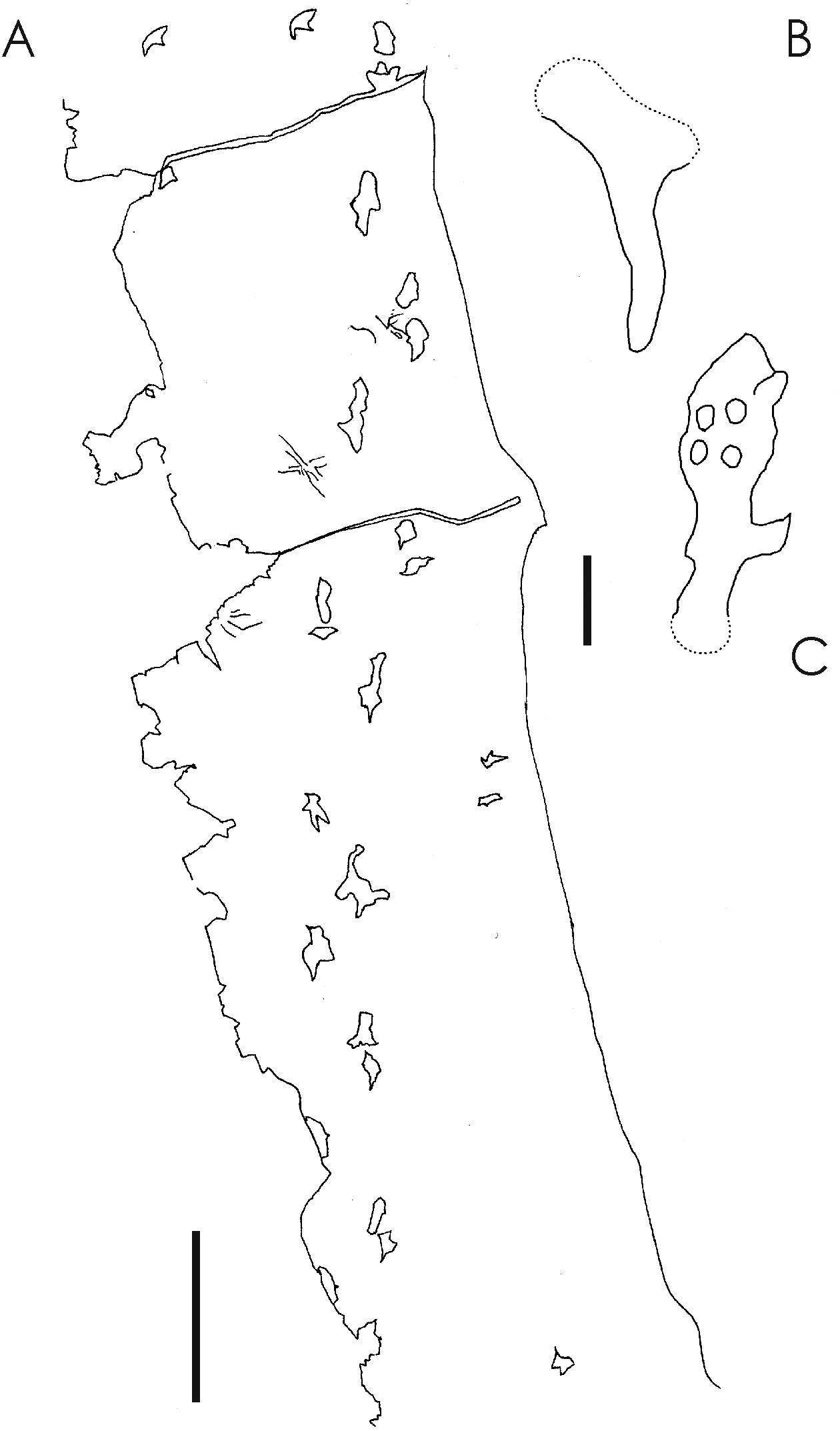
The probable azhdarchid trace fossil Haenamichnus uhangriensis.

Fossil footprints show that pterosaurs stood with the entire hind foot in contact with the ground (plantigrade), in a manner similar to many mammals like humans and bears. Footprints from azhdarchids and several unidentified species show that pterosaurs walked with an erect posture with their four limbs held almost vertically beneath the body, an energy-efficient stance used by most modern birds and mammals, rather than the sprawled limbs of modern reptiles. Indeed, erect-limbs may be omnipresent in pterosaurs.

Though traditionally depicted as ungainly and awkward when on the ground, the anatomy of some pterosaurs (particularly pterodactyloids) suggests that they were competent walkers and runners. Early pterosaurs have long been considered particularly cumbersome locomotors due to the presence of large cruropatagia, but they too appear to have been generally efficient on the ground.

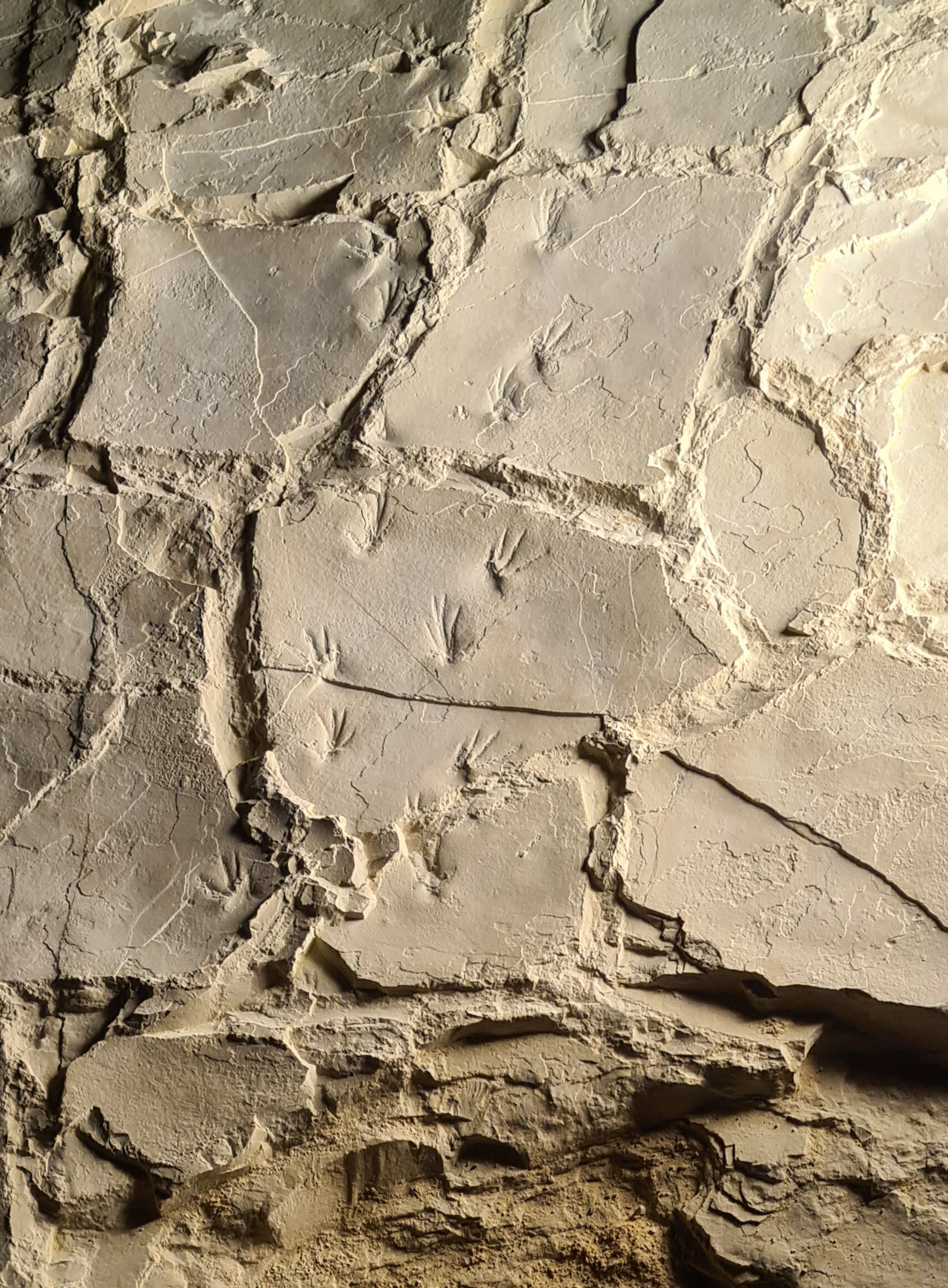
Fossil pterosaur footprints, Pterosaur Beach (France).

The forelimb bones of azhdarchids and ornithocheirids were unusually long compared to other pterosaurs, and, in azhdarchids, the bones of the arm and hand (metacarpals) were particularly elongated. Furthermore, as a whole, azhdarchid front limbs were proportioned similarly to fast-running ungulate mammals. Their hind limbs, on the other hand, were not built for speed, but they were long compared with most pterosaurs, and allowed for a long stride length. While azhdarchid pterosaurs probably could not run, they would have been relatively fast and energy efficient.

The relative size of the hands and feet in pterosaurs (by comparison with modern animals such as birds) may indicate the type of lifestyle pterosaurs led on the ground. Azhdarchid pterosaurs had relatively small feet compared to their body size and leg length, with foot length only about 25–30% the length of the lower leg. This suggests that azhdarchids were better adapted to walking on dry, relatively solid ground. Pteranodon had slightly larger feet (47% the length of the tibia), while filter-feeding pterosaurs like the ctenochasmatoids had very large feet (69% of tibial length in Pterodactylus, 84% in Pterodaustro), adapted to walking in soft muddy soil, similar to modern wading birds. Though clearly forelimb-based launchers, basal pterosaurs have hindlimbs well adapted for hopping, suggesting a connection with archosaurs such as Scleromochlus.

=== Swimming ===
Tracks made by ctenochasmatoids indicate that these pterosaurs swam using their hindlimbs. In general, these have large hindfeet and long torsos, indicating that they were probably more adapted for swimming than other pterosaurs. Pteranodontians conversely have several speciations in their humeri interpreted to have been suggestive of a water-based version of the typical quadrupedal launch, and several like boreopterids must have foraged while swimming, as they seem incapable of frigatebird-like aerial hawking. These adaptations are also seen in terrestrial pterosaurs like azhdarchids, which presumably still needed to launch from water in case they found themselves in it. The nyctosaurid Alcione may display adaptations for wing-propelled diving like modern gannets and tropicbirds.

=== Diet and feeding habits ===
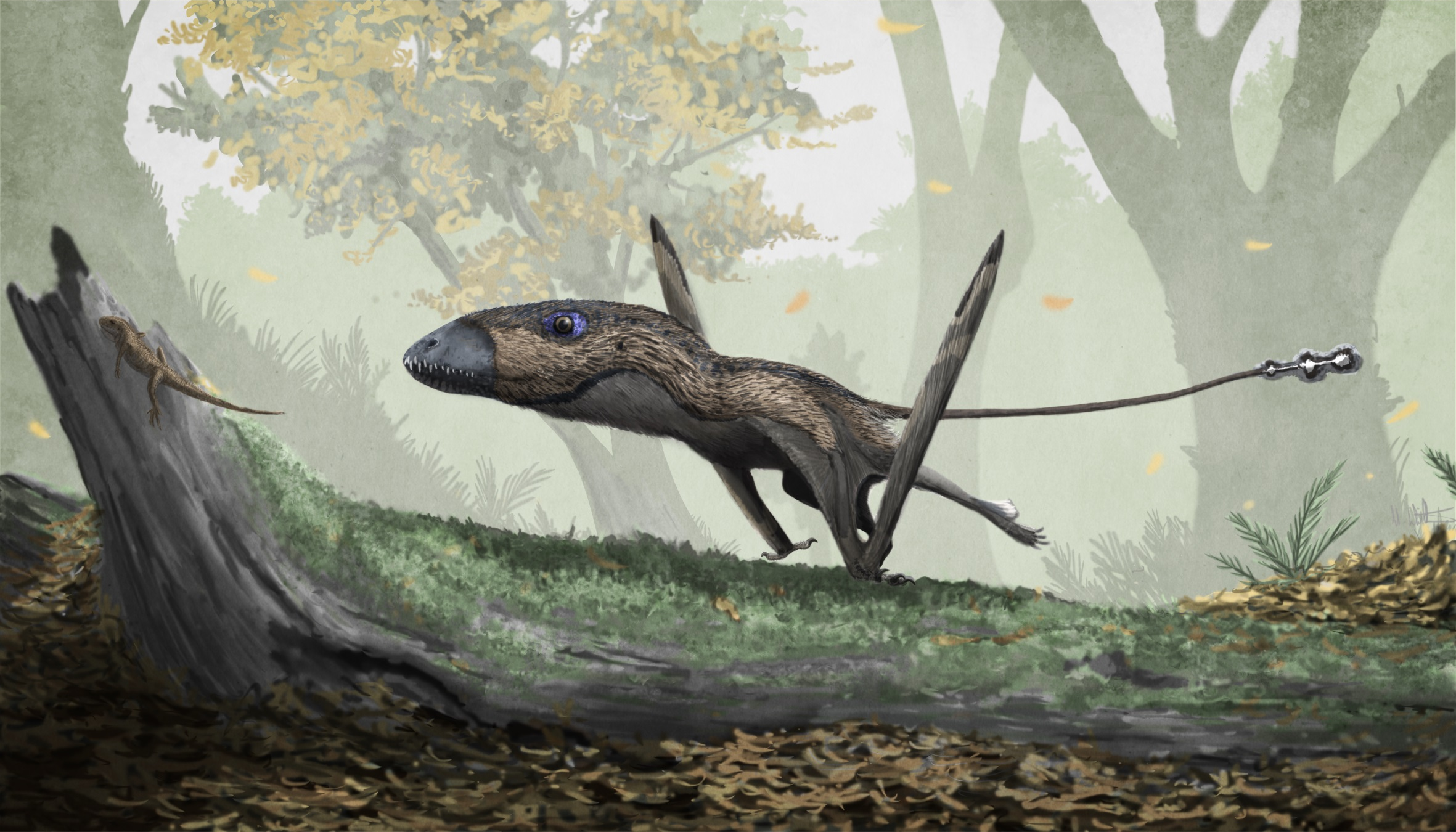
Modern interpretations of the diet of Dimorphodon have challenged traditional ideas of all pterosaurs being piscivorous

Traditionally, almost all pterosaurs were seen as surface-feeding piscivores or fish-eaters, a view that still dominates popular science. Today, many pterosaurs groups are thought to have been terrestrial carnivores, omnivores or insectivores.

Early-on it was recognised that the small Anurognathidae were nocturnal, aerial insectivores. With highly flexible joints on the wing finger, a broad, triangular wing shape, large eyes and short tail, these pterosaurs were likely analogous to nightjars or extant insectivorous bats, being capable of high manoeuvrability at relatively low speeds.

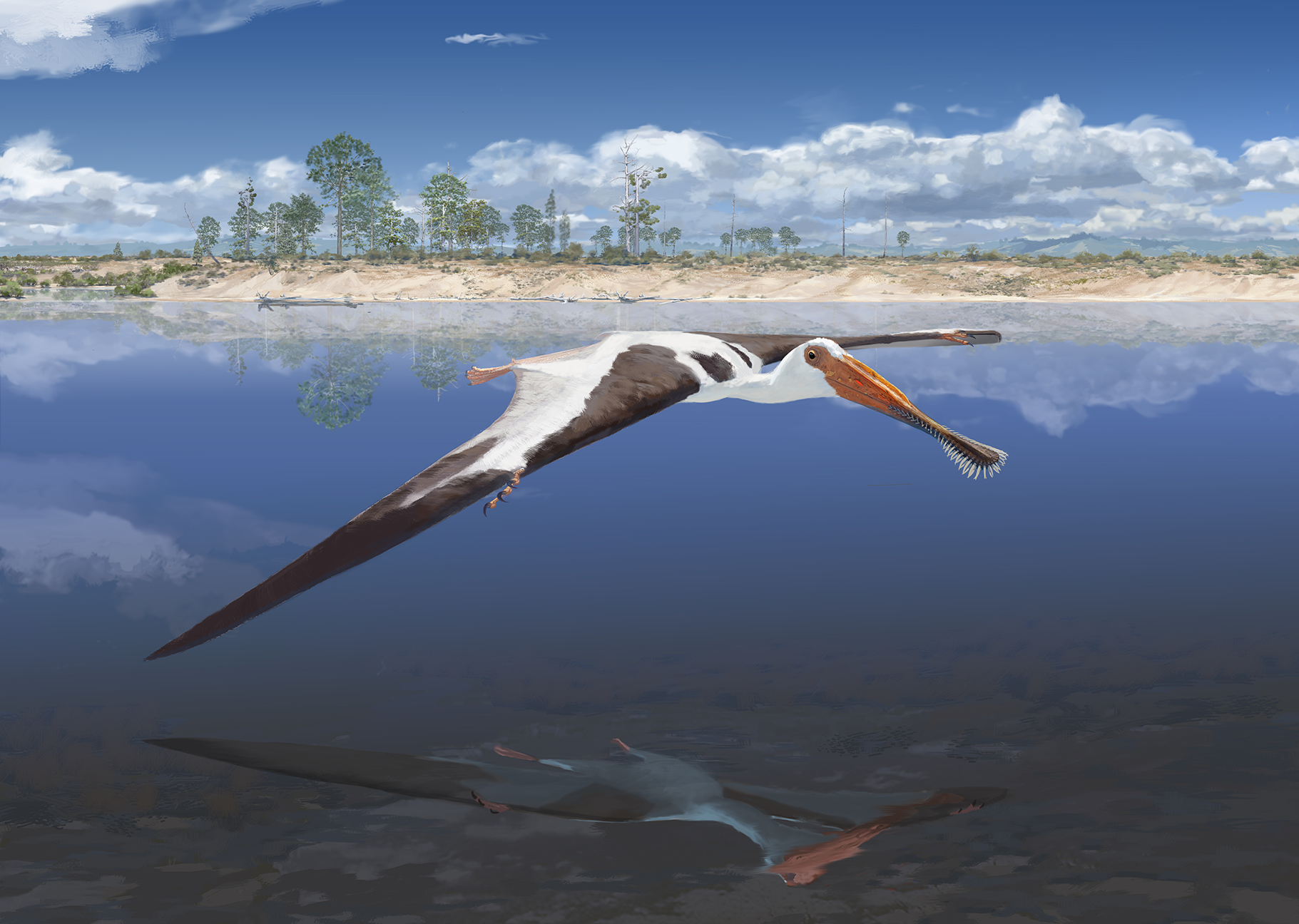
Ctenochasmatoid pterosaurs such as Lusognathus may have had specialised niches in freshwater ecosystems

Interpretations of the habits of basal groups have changed profoundly. Dimorphodon, envisioned as a puffin analogue in the past, is indicated by its jaw structure, gait, and poor flight capabilities, as a terrestrial/semiarboreal predator of small mammals, squamates, and large insects. Its robust dentition caused Campylognathoides to be seen as a generalist or a terrestrial predator of small vertebrates, but the highly robust humerus and high-aspect wing morphology, suggest it may have been capable of grabbing prey on the wing; a later study indicates it was teuthophagous based on squid findings within its gut. The small insectivorous Carniadactylus and the larger Eudimorphodon were highly aerial animals and fast, agile flyers with long robust wings. Eudimorphodon has been found with fish remains in its stomach, but its dentition suggests an opportunistic diet. Slender-winged Austriadactylus and Caviramus were likely terrestrial/semiarboreal generalists. Caviramus likely had a strong bite force, indicating an adaptation towards hard food items that might have been chewed in view of the tooth wear.

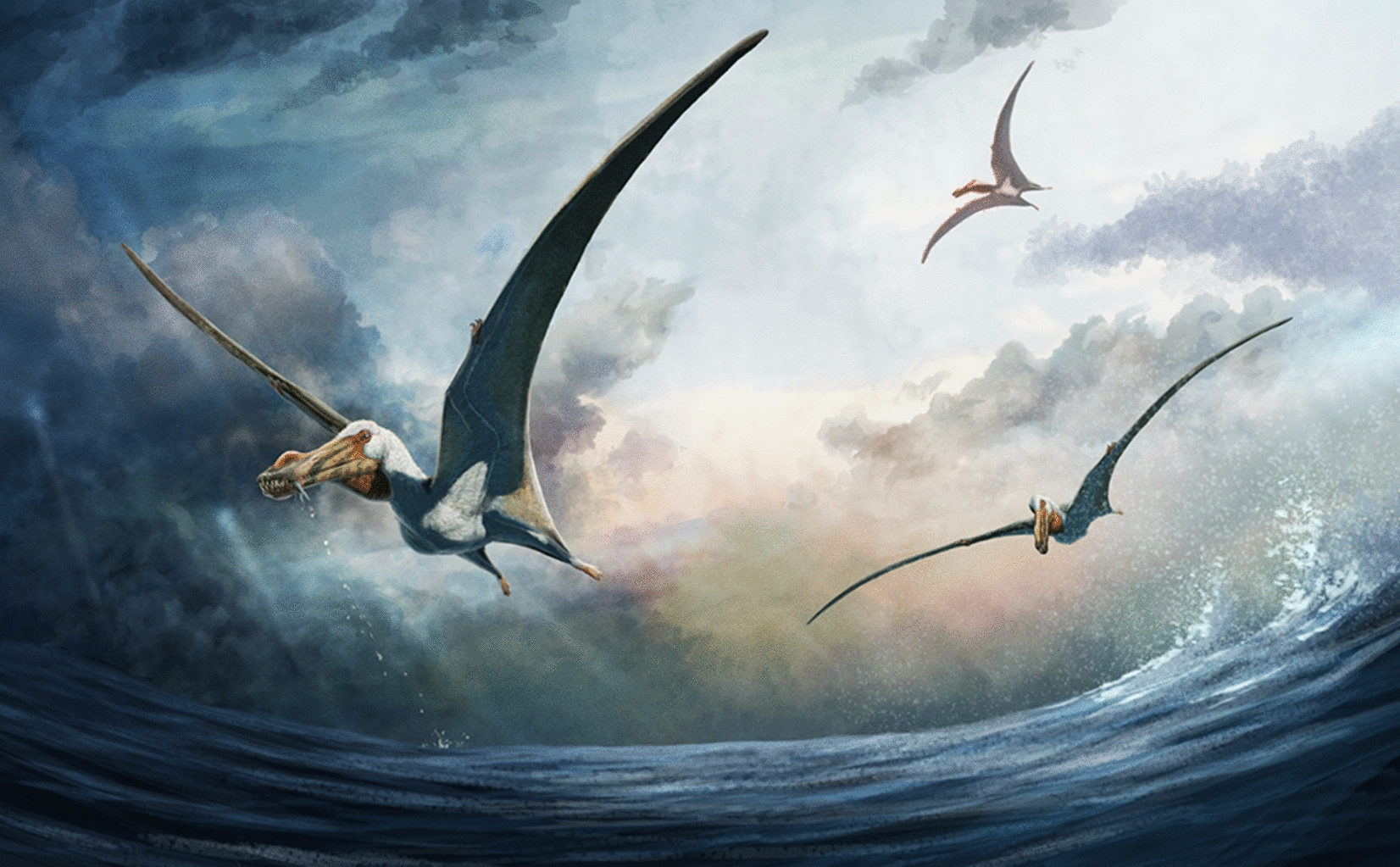
Many pteranodontoid pterosaurs such as Haliskia likely fed on fish at sea

Some Rhamphorhynchidae, such as Rhamphorhynchus itself or Dorygnathus, were fish-eaters with long, slender wings, needle-like dentition and long, thin jaws. Sericipterus, Scaphognathus and Harpactognathus had more robust jaws and teeth (which were ziphodont, dagger-shaped, in Sericipterus), and shorter, broader wings. These were either terrestrial/aerial predators of vertebrates or corvid-like generalists. Wukongopteridae like Darwinopterus were first considered aerial predators. Lacking a robust jaw structure or powerful flying muscles, they are now seen as arboreal or semiterrestrial insectivores. Darwinopterus robustidens, in particular, seems to have been a beetle specialist.

Among pterodactyloids, a greater variation in diet is present. Pteranodontia contained many piscivorous taxa, such as the Ornithocheirae, Boreopteridae, Pteranodontidae and Nyctosauridae. Niche partitioning caused ornithocheirans and the later nyctosaurids to be aerial dip-feeders like today's frigatebirds (with the exception of the plunge-diving adapted Alcione elainus), while boreopterids were freshwater diving animals similar to cormorants, and pteranodonts pelagic plunge-divers akin to boobies and gannets. An analysis of Lonchodraco found clusters of foramina at the tip of its beak; birds with similarly numerous foramina have sensitive beaks used to feel for food, so Lonchodraco may have used its beak to feel for fish or invertebrates in shallow water. The istiodactylids were likely primarily scavengers. Archaeopterodactyloidea obtained food in coastal or freshwater habitats. Germanodactylus and Pterodactylus were piscivores, while the Ctenochasmatidae were suspension feeders, using their numerous fine teeth to filter small organisms from shallow water. Pterodaustro was adapted for flamingo-like filter-feeding.

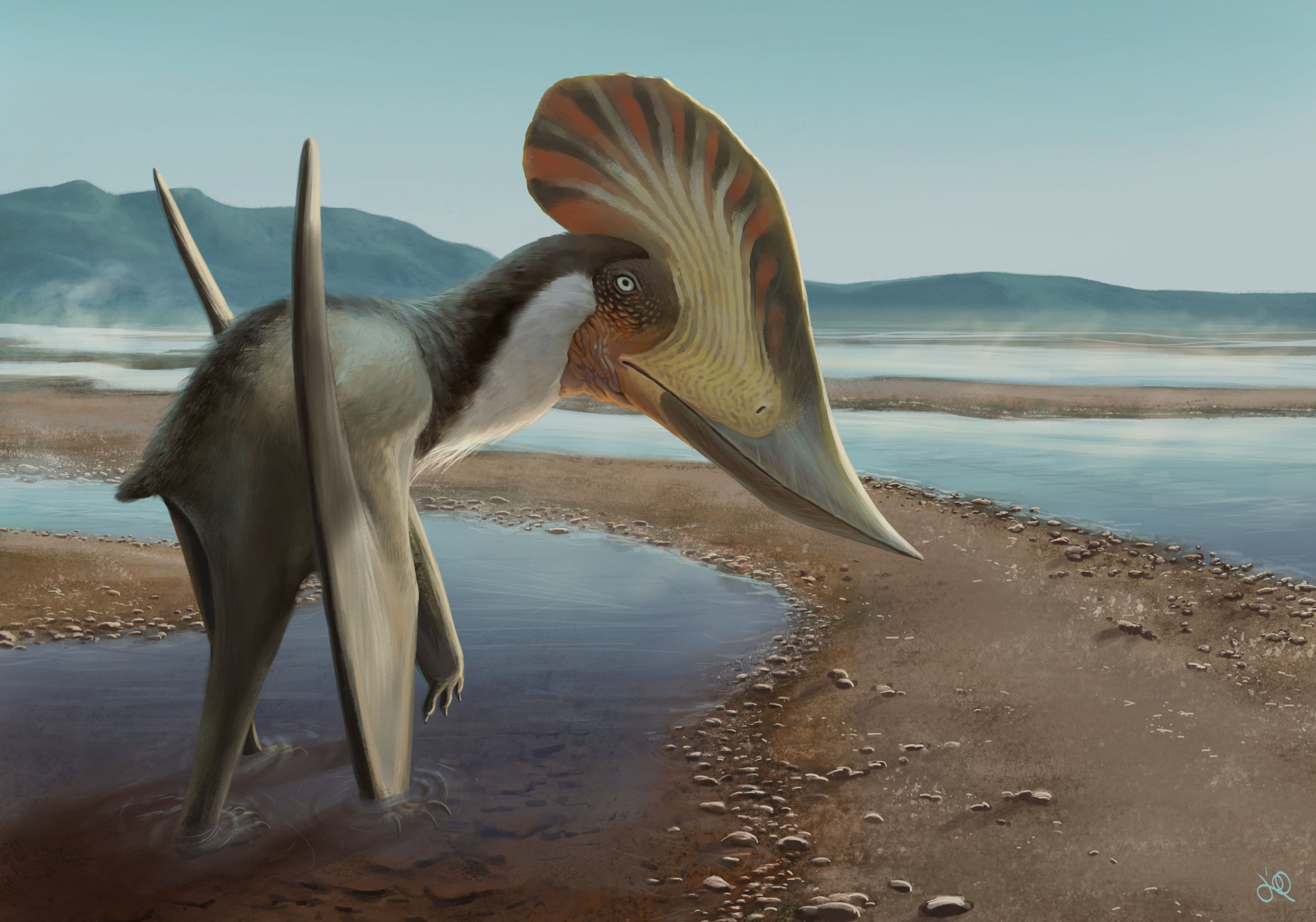
Azhdarchoid pterosaurs such as Kariridraco fed on terrestrial prey

In contrast, Azhdarchoidea mostly were terrestrial predators. Tapejaridae were arboreal omnivores, likely supplementing seeds and fruits with small insects and vertebrates. Gut contents consisting of phytoliths from various plants in a specimen of the tapejarid Sinopterus constitute the first evidence of herbivory in a pterosaur. Dsungaripteridae were specialist molluscivores, using their powerful jaws to crush the shells of molluscs and crustaceans. Thalassodromidae were likely terrestrial carnivores. Thalassodromeus itself was named after a fishing method known as "skim-feeding", later understood to be biomechanically impossible. Perhaps it pursued relatively large prey, in view of its reinforced jaw joints and relatively high bite force. Azhdarchidae are now understood to be terrestrial predators akin to ground hornbills or some storks, eating any prey item they could swallow whole. Hatzegopteryx was a robustly built predator of relatively large prey, including medium-sized dinosaurs. Alanqa may have been a specialist molluscivore.

A 2021 study reconstructed the adductor musculature of skulls from pterodactyloids, estimating the bite force and potential dietary habits of nine selected species. The study corroborated the view of pteranodontids, nyctosaurids and anhanuerids as piscivores based on them being relatively weak but fast biters, and suggest that Tropeognathus mesembrinus was specialised in consuming relatively large prey compared to Anhanguera. This interpretation was further supported by a 2026 study that recovered steroid biomarkers from an anhanguerid fossil consistent with a fish- and cephalopod-based diet. Dsungaripterus was corroborated as a durophage, with Thalassodromeus proposed to share this feeding habit based on high estimated bite force quotients (BFQ) and absolute bite force values. Tapejara wellnhoferi was corroborated as a specialised consumer of hard plant material with a relatively high BFQ and high mechanical advantage, and Caupedactylus ybaka and Tupuxuara leonardii were proposed to be ground-feeding generalists with intermediate bite force values and less specialised jaws.

=== Natural predators ===
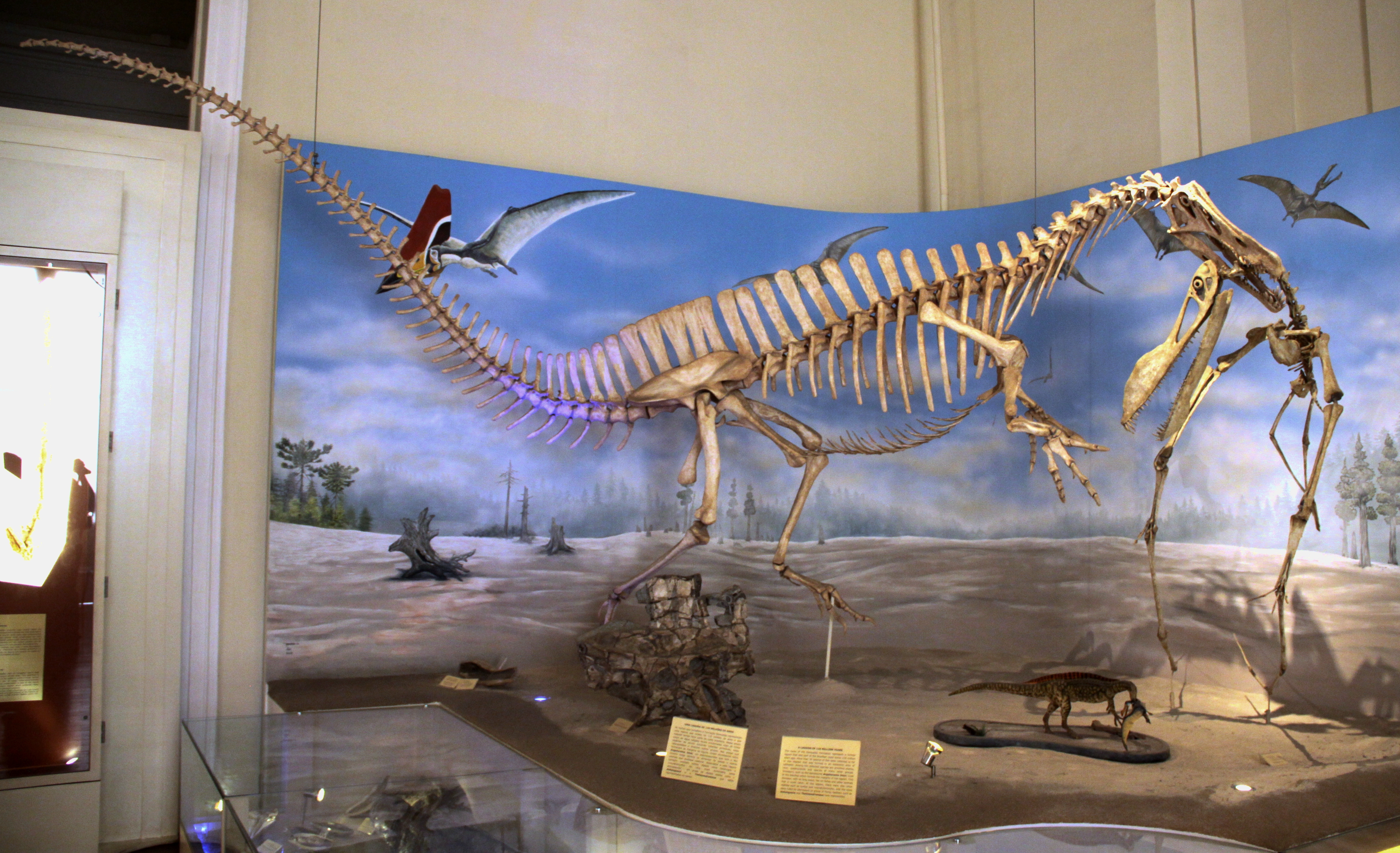
Theropod dinosaur Irritator shown feeding on a pterosaur

Pterosaurs are known to have been eaten by theropods. In the 1 July 2004 edition of Nature, paleontologist Éric Buffetaut discusses an Early Cretaceous fossil of three cervical vertebrae of a pterosaur with the broken tooth of a spinosaur, most likely Irritator, embedded in it. The vertebrae are known not to have been eaten and exposed to digestion, as the joints are still articulated. Fossils of Pteranodon have been found with tooth marks from sharks such as Squalicorax, and a fossil with tooth marks from the Toolebuc Formation has been interpreted as being attacked or scavenged by an ichthyosaur (most likely Platypterygius).

=== Reproduction and life history ===
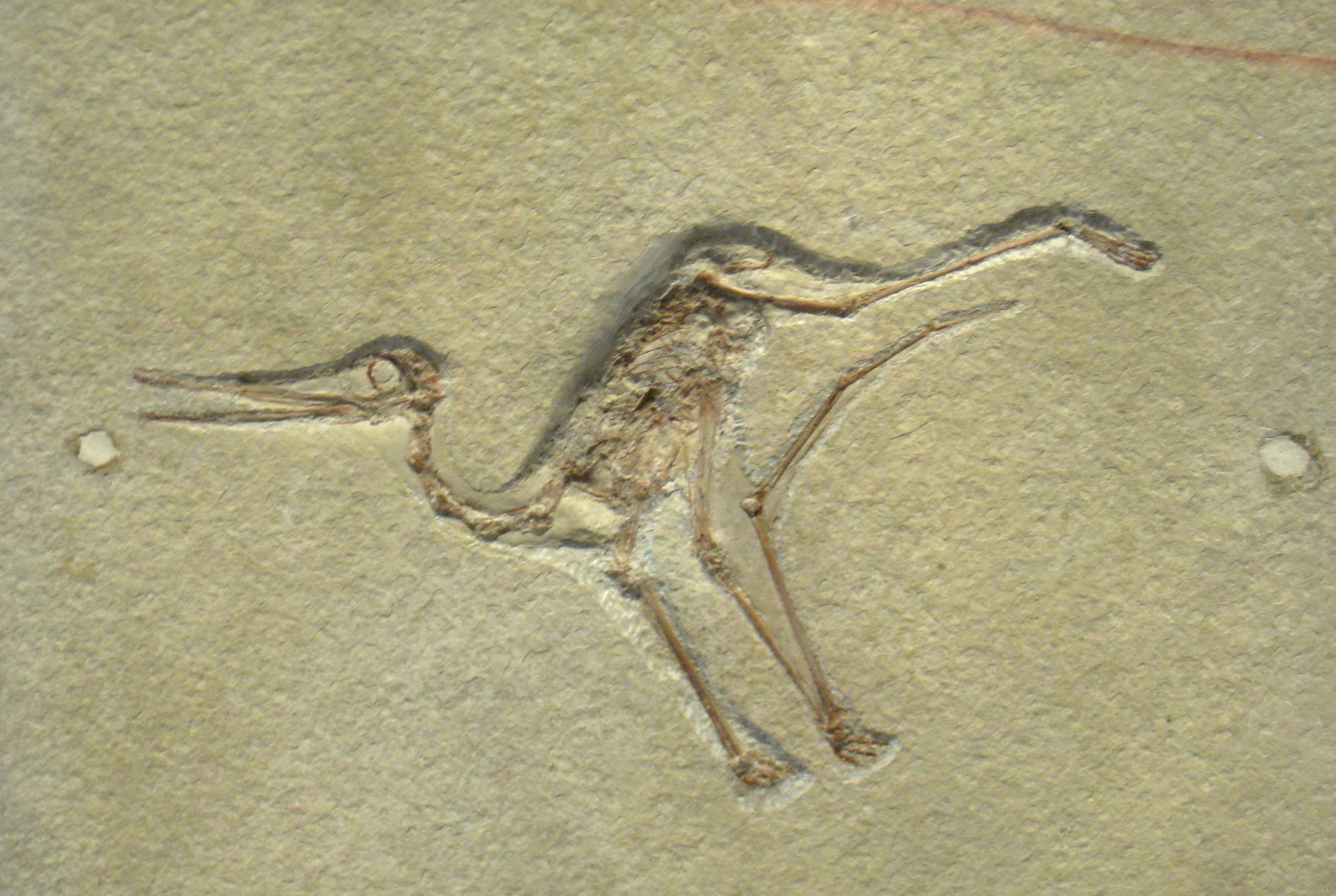
Fossil pterodactyloid juvenile from the Solnhofen Limestone

While very little is known about pterosaur reproduction, it is believed that, similar to all dinosaurs, all pterosaurs reproduced by laying eggs, though such findings are very rare. The first known pterosaur eggs were found in the quarries of Liaoning, the same place that yielded feathered dinosaurs, and in Loma del Pterodaustro (Lagarcito Formation, Argentina). The eggs from Liaoning were squashed flat with no signs of cracking, so evidently the eggs had leathery shells, as in modern lizards. The egg from the Lagarcito Formation was laid by a Pterodaustro, a pterosaur known by abundant material. This was supported by the description of an additional pterosaur egg belonging to the genus Darwinopterus, described in 2011, which also had a leathery shell and, also like modern reptiles but unlike birds, was fairly small compared to the size of the mother. In 2014 five unflattened eggs from the species Hamipterus tianshanensis were found in an Early Cretaceous deposit in northwest China. Examination of the shells by scanning electron microscopy showed the presence of a thin calcareous eggshell layer with a membrane underneath. A study of pterosaur eggshell structure and chemistry published in 2007 indicated that it is likely pterosaurs buried their eggs, like modern crocodiles and turtles. Egg-burying would have been beneficial to the early evolution of pterosaurs, as it allows for more weight-reducing adaptations, but this method of reproduction would also have put limits on the variety of environments pterosaurs could live in and may have disadvantaged them when they began to face ecological competition from birds.

A Darwinopterus specimen showcases that at least some pterosaurs had a pair of functional ovaries, as opposed to the single functional ovary in birds, dismissing the reduction of functional ovaries as a requirement for powered flight.

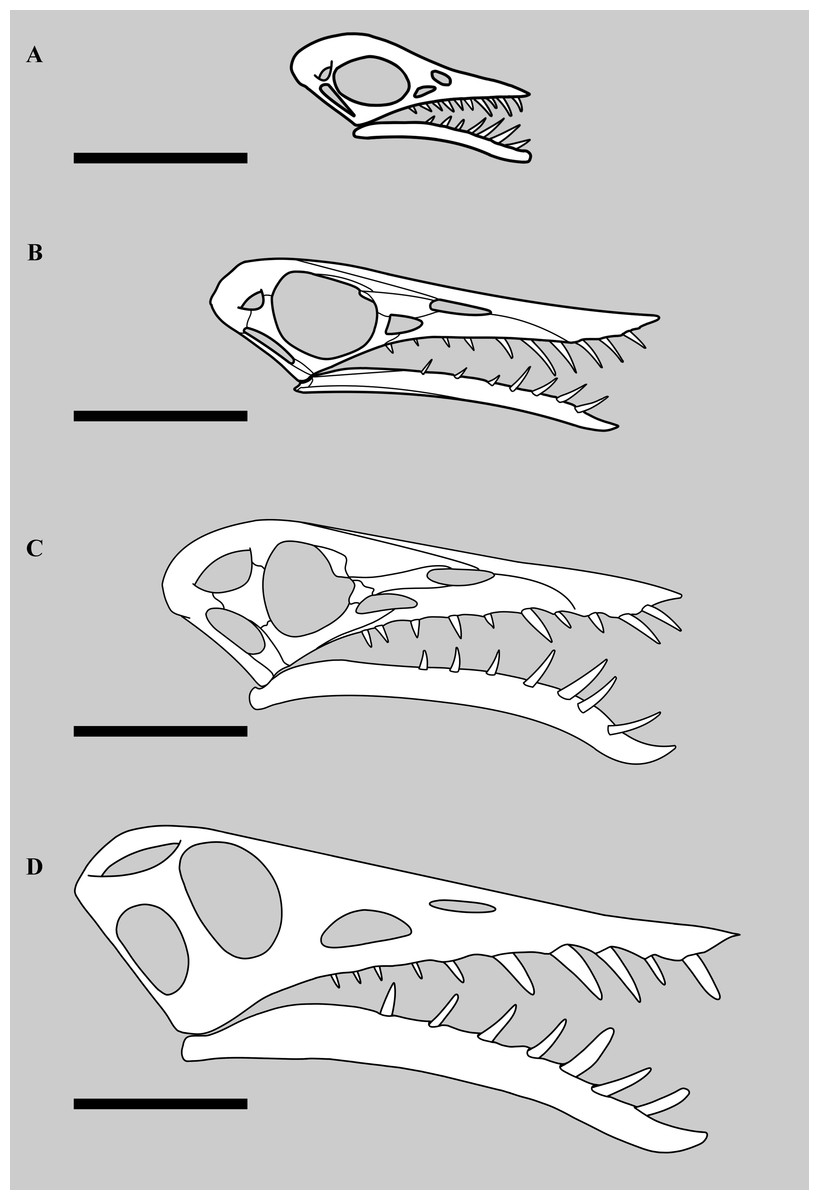
Growth series of Rhamphorhynchus specimens showing changes throughout life

Wing membranes preserved in pterosaur embryos are well developed, suggesting that pterosaurs were ready to fly soon after birth. However, tomography scans of fossilised Hamipterus eggs suggests that the young pterosaurs had well-developed thigh bones for walking, but weak chests for flight. It is unknown if this holds true for other pterosaurs. Fossils of pterosaurs only a few days to a week old (called "flaplings") have been found, representing several pterosaur families, including pterodactylids, rhamphorhinchids, ctenochasmatids and azhdarchids. All preserved bones that show a relatively high degree of hardening (ossification) for their age, and wing proportions similar to adults. In fact, many pterosaur flaplings have been considered adults and placed in separate species in the past. Additionally, flaplings are normally found in the same sediments as adults and juveniles of the same species, such as the Pterodactylus and Rhamphorhynchus flaplings found in the Solnhofen limestone of Germany, and Pterodaustro flaplings from Argentina. All are found in deep aquatic environment far from shore.

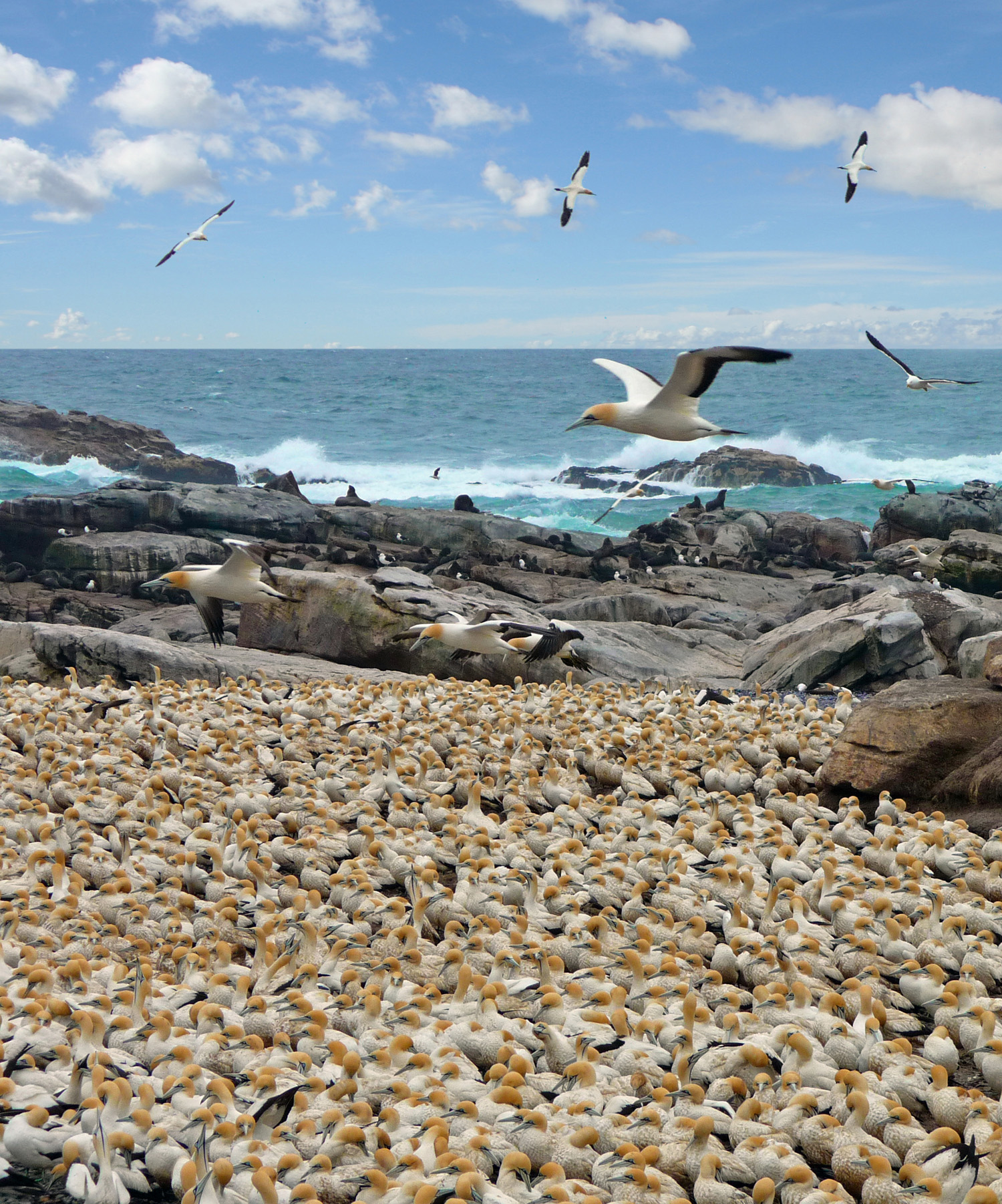
Some pterosaurs may have reproduced in colonies similar to those of modern seabirds

For the majority of pterosaur species, it is not known whether they practiced any form of parental care, but their ability to fly as soon as they emerged from the egg and the numerous flaplings found in environments far from nests and alongside adults has led most researchers, including Christopher Bennett and David Unwin, to conclude that the young were dependent on their parents for a relatively short period of time, during a period of rapid growth while the wings grew long enough to fly, and then left the nest to fend for themselves, possibly within days of hatching. Alternatively, they may have used stored yolk products for nourishment during their first few days of life, as in modern reptiles, rather than depend on parents for food. Fossilised Hamipterus nests were shown preserving many male and female pterosaurs together with their eggs in a manner to a similar to that of modern seabird colonies. Due to how underdeveloped the chests of the hatchlings were for flying, it was suggested that Hamipterus may have practiced some form of parental care. However, this study has since been criticised. Most evidence currently leans towards pterosaur hatchlings being superprecocial, similar to that of megapode birds, which fly after hatching without the need of parental care. A further study compares evidence for superprecociality and "late term flight" and overwhelmingly suggests that most if not all pterosaurs were capable of flight soon after hatching. A later study suggested that while smaller-bodied pterosaurs were most likely superprecocial or precocial, owing to the consistent or decreasing wing aspect ratio during growth, certain large-bodied pterosaurs, such as Pteranodon showed possible evidence of their young being altricial, due to the fast rate the limb bones closest to the body grew compared to any other element of their skeleton after hatching. Other factors mentioned were the limits of soft shelled eggs and the size of the pelvic opening of large female pterosaurs.

Growth rates of pterosaurs once they hatched varied across different groups. In earlier, long-tailed pterosaurs ("rhamphorhynchoids"), such as Rhamphorhynchus, the average growth rate during the first year of life was 130% to 173%, slightly faster than the growth rate of alligators. Growth in these species slowed after sexual maturity, and it would have taken more than three years for Rhamphorhynchus to attain maximum size. In contrast, the later pterodactyloid pterosaurs, such as Pteranodon, grew to adult size within the first year of life. Additionally, pterodactyloids had determinate growth, meaning that the animals reached a fixed maximum adult size and stopped growing.

A 2021 study indicates that pterosaur juveniles of larger species increasingly took the roles previously occupied by adult small pterosaurs.

=== Daily activity patterns ===
Comparisons between the scleral rings of pterosaurs and modern birds and reptiles have been used to infer daily activity patterns of pterosaurs. The pterosaur genera Pterodactylus, Scaphognathus, and Tupuxuara have been inferred to be diurnal, Ctenochasma, Pterodaustro, and Rhamphorhynchus have been inferred to be nocturnal, and Tapejara has been inferred to be cathemeral, being active throughout the day for short intervals. As a result, the possibly fish-eating Ctenochasma and Rhamphorhynchus may have had similar activity patterns to modern nocturnal seabirds, and the filter-feeding Pterodaustro may have had similar activity patterns to modern anseriform birds that feed at night. The differences between activity patterns of the Solnhofen pterosaurs Ctenochasma, Rhamphorhynchus, Scaphognathus, and Pterodactylus may also indicate niche partitioning between these genera.

== Cultural significance ==
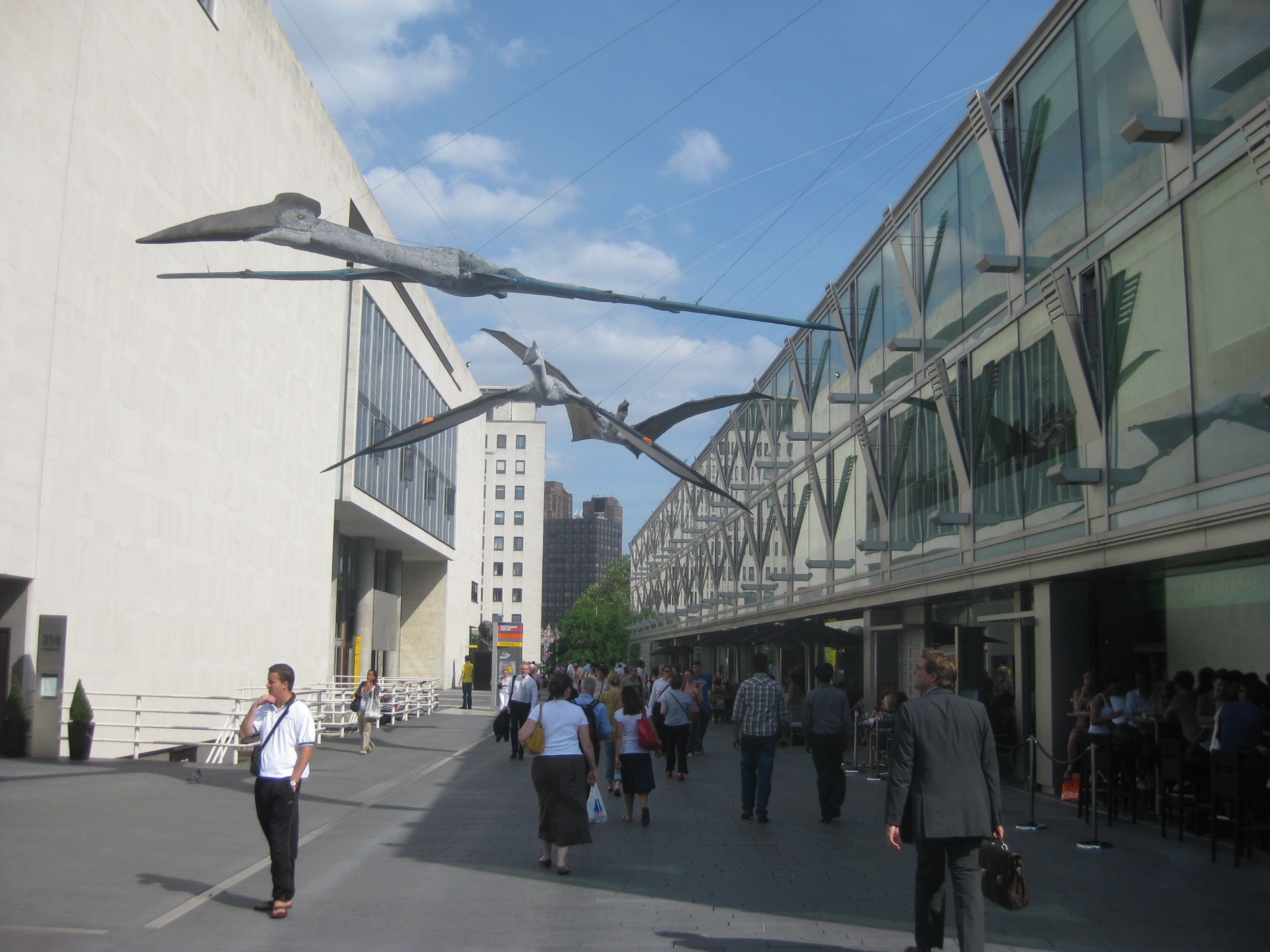
Quetzalcoatlus models on the South Bank, created by Mark Witton for the Royal Society's 350th anniversary

Pterosaurs have been a staple of popular culture for as long as their cousins the dinosaurs, though they are usually not featured as prominently in films, literature, or other art. While the depiction of dinosaurs in popular media has changed radically in response to advances in paleontology, a mainly outdated picture of pterosaurs has persisted since the mid-20th century.

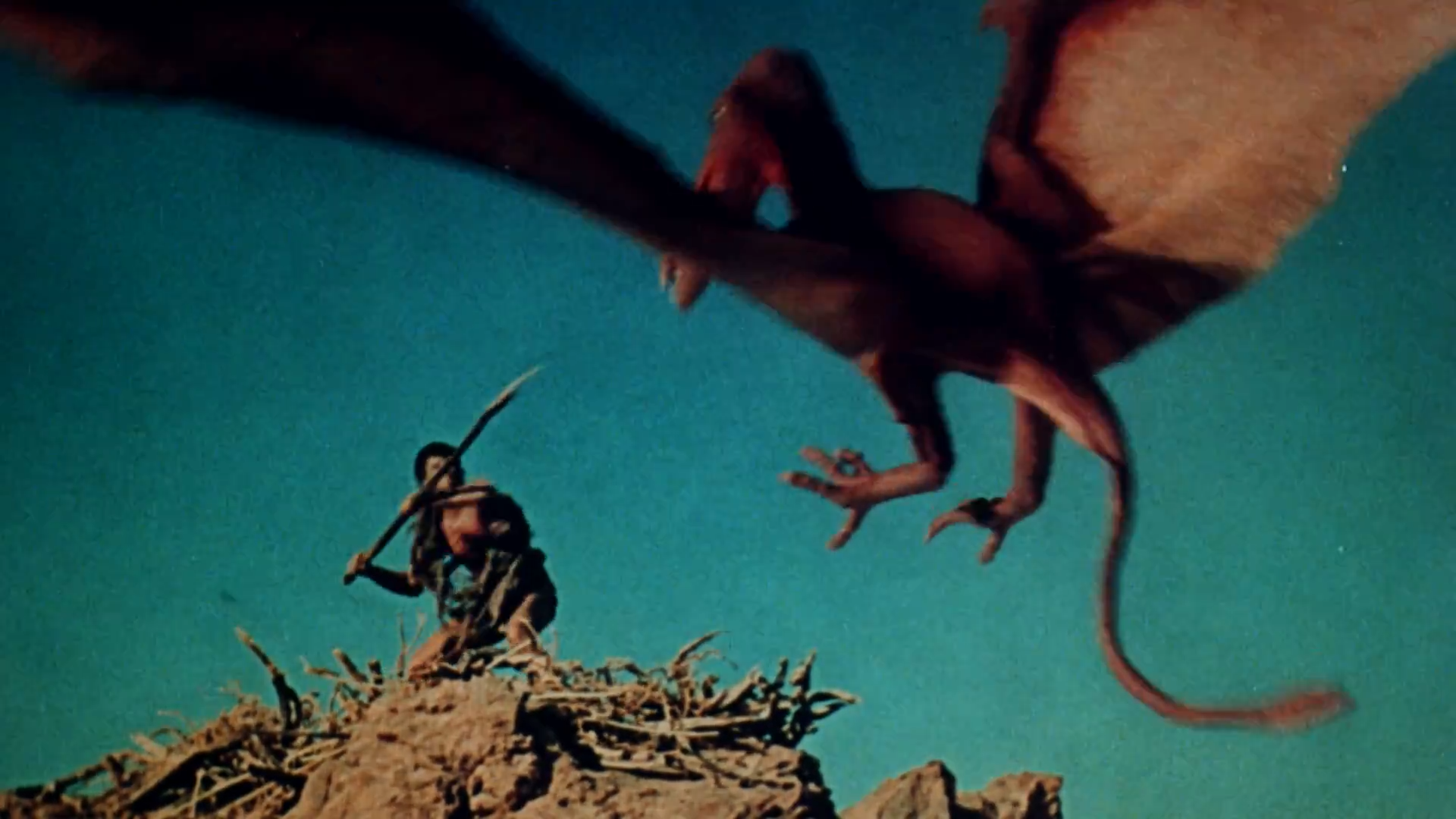
Scene from When Dinosaurs Ruled the Earth depicting an outsized Rhamphorhynchus

The vague generic term "pterodactyl" is often used for these creatures. The animals depicted in fiction and pop culture as “pterodactyls” frequently represent either Pteranodon or (non-pterodactyloid) Rhamphorhynchus, or a fictionalized hybrid of the two. Many children's toys and cartoons feature "pterodactyls" with Pteranodon-like crests and long, Rhamphorhynchus-like tails and teeth, a combination that never existed in nature. However, at least one pterosaur did have both teeth and a Pteranodon-like crest: Ludodactylus, whose name means "toy finger" for its resemblance to old, inaccurate children's toys. Pterosaurs have sometimes been incorrectly identified as (the ancestors of) birds, though birds are theropod dinosaurs and not descendants of pterosaurs.

Pterosaurs were used in fiction in Sir Arthur Conan Doyle's 1912 novel The Lost World and its 1925 film adaptation. They appeared in a number of films and television programs since, including the 1933 film King Kong, and 1966's One Million Years B.C. In the latter, animator Ray Harryhausen had to add inaccurate bat-like wing fingers to his stop motion models in order to keep the membranes from falling apart, though this particular error was common in art even before the film was made. Rodan, a fictional giant monster (or kaiju) which first appeared in the 1956 film Rodan, is portrayed as an enormous irradiated species of Pteranodon. Rodan has appeared in multiple Japanese Godzilla films released during the 1960s, 1970s, 1990s, and 2000s, and also appeared in the 2019 American-produced film Godzilla: King of the Monsters.

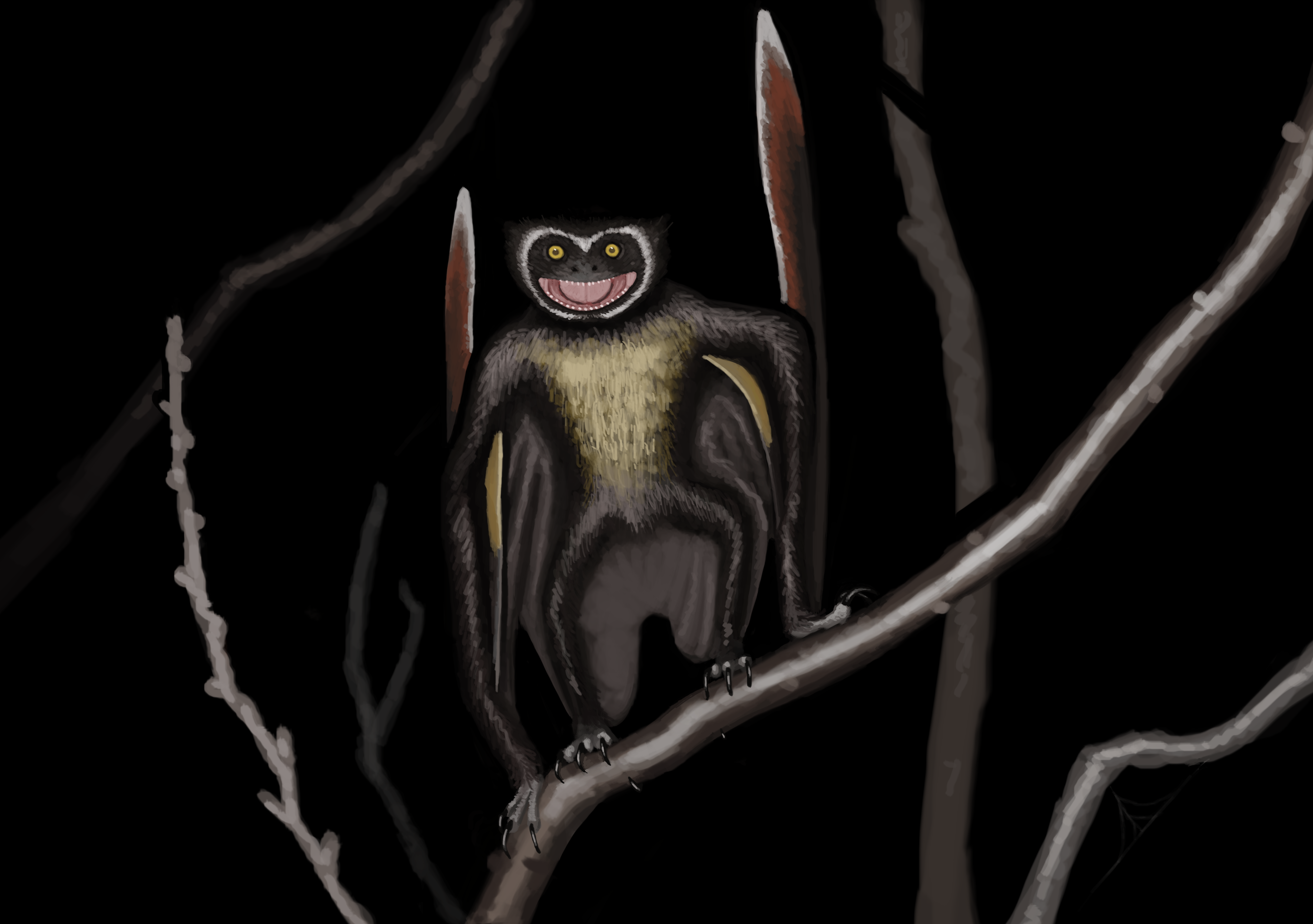
Versperopterylus is one of the only pterosaurs with grasping feet, despite popular depictions of them on many pterosaurs

The Fell Beasts of J.R.R. Tolkien's Lord of the Rings are often understood as "pterosaur-like", although Tolkien himself did deny they were actual pterosaurs.

After the 1960s, pterosaurs remained mostly absent from notable American film appearances until 2001's Jurassic Park III. Paleontologist Dave Hone noted that the pterosaurs in this film had not been significantly updated to reflect modern research. Errors persisting were teeth while toothless Pteranodon was intended to be depicted, nesting behavior that was known to be inaccurate by 2001, and leathery wings, rather than the taut membranes of muscle fiber required for pterosaur flight. Petrie from The Land Before Time (1988), is a notable example from an animated film.

In most media appearances, pterosaurs are depicted as piscivores, not reflecting their full dietary variation. They are also often shown as aerial predators similar to birds of prey, grasping human victims with talons on their feet. However, only the small anurognathid Vesperopterylus and small wukongopterid Kunpengopterus are known to possess prehensile feet and hands respectively; all other known pterosaurs have flat, plantigrade feet with no opposable toes, and the feet are generally proportionally small, at least in the case of the Pteranodontia.

== See also ==
- Flying and gliding animals
- Graphical timeline of pterosaurs
- List of pterosaur-bearing stratigraphic units
- List of pterosaur genera
- Phylogeny of pterosaurs
- Pterosaur Beach
- Pterosaur size
- Timeline of pterosaur research
- Scansoriopterygidae
- Yi (dinosaur)

== Sources ==
- Berry, Mark F. (2005). The Dinosaur Filmography. McFarland & Company. ISBN 978-0-7864-2453-5.
- Wellnhofer, Peter (1991). The Illustrated Encyclopedia of Pterosaurs: An Illustrated Natural History of the Flying Reptiles of the Mesozoic Era. Crescent Books. ISBN 978-0-517-03701-0.
- Witton, Mark (2013). Pterosaurs: Natural History, Evolution, Anatomy. Princeton University Press. ISBN 978-0-691-15061-1.
