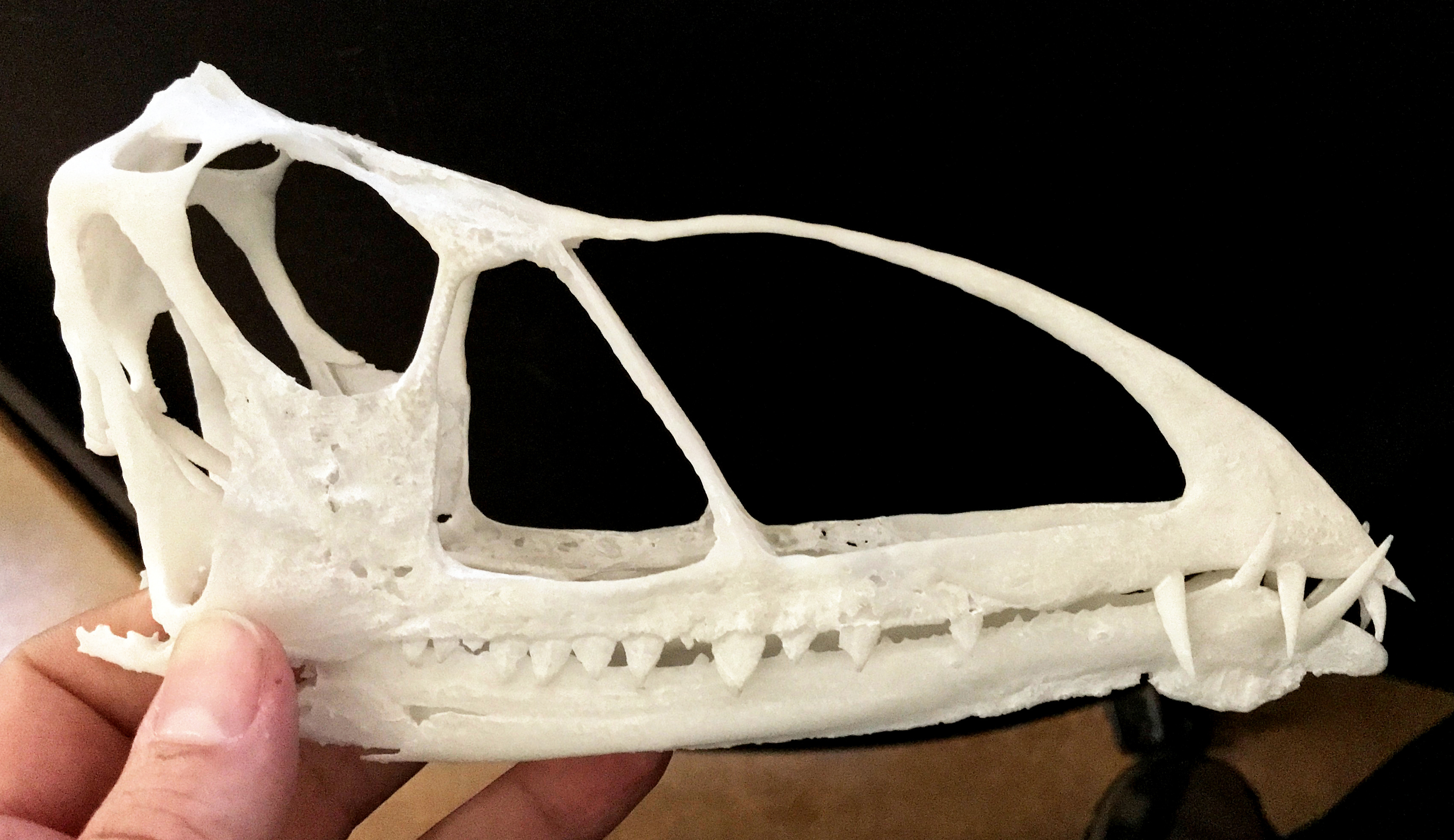
- 3D printed skull reconstruction; the dip in the forehead is perhaps too pronounced

Scientific classification
- Kingdom: Animalia
- Phylum: Chordata
- Class: Reptilia
- Order: †Pterosauria
- Clade: †Macronychoptera
- Family: †Dimorphodontidae
- Genus: †Caelestiventus; Britt et al., 2018

Type species
- †Caelestiventus hanseni Britt et al., 2018

= Caelestiventus =

Caelestiventus Temporal range: Late Triassic, ~205–201 Ma

Genus of pterosaur from the Late Triassic

Caelestiventus (/səˌlɛstɪˈvɛntəs/ sə-LES-tih-VEN-təs, meaning "heavenly wind") is a pterosaur genus from the Late Triassic (latest Norian or Rhaetian) found in western North America. The type species, Caelestiventus hanseni, honors Robin Hansen, the Bureau of Land Management geologist (BLM), who facilitated access to the excavation site.

Caelestiventus is important because it is the sole example of a desert-dwelling non-pterodactyloid pterosaur and is 65 million years older than other known desert-dwelling pterosaurs. Additionally, it shows that even the earliest pterosaurs were morphologically and ecologically diverse and that the Dimorphodontidae originated in the Triassic period. Along with Eotephradactylus, the genus represents one of the oldest known North American pterosaurs.

== Discovery ==
Caelestiventus was recovered from the Saints & Sinners Quarry of northeastern Utah. The site was discovered in 2007 by Dan Chure and George Engelmann while working on the geology and paleontology of the fossilized dunes of the Nugget Sandstone. In 2015 the discovery of Caelestiventus was reported in the scientific literature. The type locality of Caelestiventus is thought to have been younger than 208 to 202.5 million years ago but older than the very end of the Late Triassic, which corresponds to the latest Norian or Rhaetian and is slightly younger than the age of the other Late Triassic North American pterosaur Eotephradactylus.

== Description ==
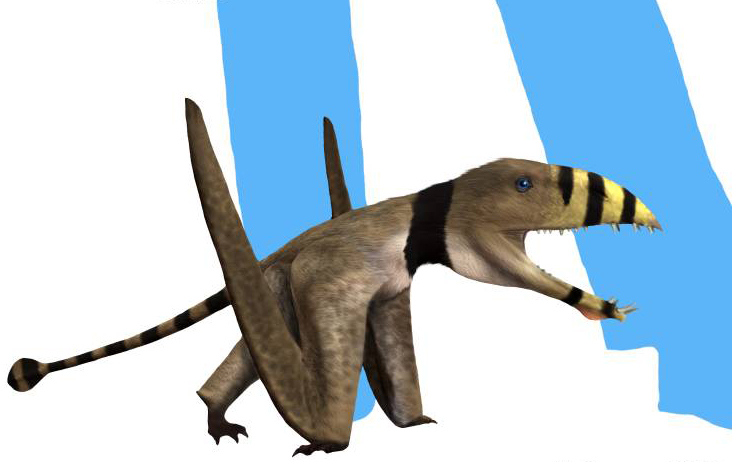
Restoration

Most Triassic pterosaurs are small. Caelestiventus, however, is one of the largest (if not the largest) known Triassic pterosaurs, with a wingspan of at least 1.5 meters (4.9 ft) and a skull 17.8 cm (7.0 in) long (based on a complete mandible). These measurements are based on the only known specimen, which had not yet reached full maturity at the time of its death; a full-grown Caelestiventus would have been even larger. Unlike most Triassic pterosaur fossils which are often severely crushed, the bones of Caelestiventus are three-dimensional and relatively intact. This preservation provides insights into the delicate structures of skull bones, including pneumatic features such as foramina/fossae and internal chambers.

Caelestiventus is known from a single individual (BYU 20707, in the Museum of Paleontology at Brigham Young University) that preserves much of the skull (skull cap, sides of the face, and a complete lower jaw (mandible) along with a single non-skull bone – the last finger bone at the end of the elongated fourth finger (manual digit IV 4) that supported the tip of the wing.

=== Skull ===
Most of the skull is known. The laterally narrow and vertically deep skull is similar to that of Dimorphodon, with an enormous external naris (nostril) being the largest skull opening, and a large antorbital fenestra. Unlike most pterosaurs, the margin of the antorbital fenestra bears a remnant of an antorbital fossa.

The skull roof has a median ridge as well as large ridges along the medial borders of the upper temporal fenestra that mark attachments for the muscle that closed the mandible. A prominent hood at the back of the skull, the nuchal crest, marks the attachment of large neck muscles. Sizable pneumatic openings on the skull top lead into small pneumatic chambers in the skull roof. The uncrushed skull cap permitted the first endocranial reconstruction in a Triassic pterosaur and shows the brain had large cerebral lobes, from which the optic lobes bulge, and small olfactory lobes.

The lower portion of the front of the mandible has a keel. There are large pneumatic openings in the posterior mandible and the whole of the mandible is hollow and was likely air-filled (pneumatic). The presence of a medially deflected mandibular flange has been suggested to represent an attachment point for gular skin, as observed in some other pterosaurs, such as Rhamphorhynchus and Pterodactylus. The authors of the study speculate that a gular pouch could have functioned to store prey, or for visual display and vocal communication.

Caelestiventus is a heterodont, with three different tooth shapes - long fang-like spikes, large "leaf-shaped" blades, and tiny blades. There are two long, spike-shaped teeth near the front of each side of the lower jaws that were likely opposed by similar teeth at the tip of the skull snout (premaxilla). In the lower jaws, behind the fangs, there is a tooth gap (diastema) which is followed by 38 tiny teeth on each side of the lower jaw (mandibular ramus). Each upper jaw bone (maxilla) is armed with twelve large, blade-like, triangular teeth. Both sides of the maxillary teeth are strengthened by a central ridge and these teeth terminate in two tips (bicuspid).

== Classification ==
Phylogenetic analyses show Caelestiventus as the sister taxon to Dimorphodon macronyx in the family Dimorphodontidae, which was defined by Britt and colleagues as the most inclusive clade containing Caelestiventus hanseni and Dimorphodon macronyx, the only two genera recovered as dimorphodontids in their analyses. They also found that the purported Dimorphodon species 'D.' weintraubi is the sister taxon to Anurognathidae, and thus was outside of Dimorphodontidae as defined by Britt and colleagues.

- Pterosauria
  - - Austriadraco dallavecchiai
    - Arcticodactylus cromptonellus
  - - - Preondactylus buffarinii
      - Austriadactylus cristatus
    - - Peteinosaurus zambellii
      - Macronychoptera
        - Dimorphodontidae
          - Dimorphodon macronyx
          - Caelestiventus hanseni
        - Lonchognatha
          - Eudimorphodontidae
            - Eudimorphodon ranzii
            - - Carniadactylus rosenfeldi
              - - Caviramus schesaplanensis
                - Raeticodactylus filisurensis
          - Novialoidea
            - Campylognathoides
            - Caelidracones
              - Anurognathidae
                - "Dimorphodon" weintraubi
                - - Batrachognathus volans
                  - - Anurognathus ammoni
                    - - Dendrorhynchoides
                      - Jeholopterus ningchengensis
              - - Rhamphorhynchidae
                  - - Dorygnathus banthensis
                    - Rhamphorhynchus muensteri
                  - Scaphognathus crassirostris
                - Sordes pilosus
                - Monofenestrata
                  - Darwinopterus
                  - - Pterodactylus antiquus
                    - - Pteranodon longiceps
                      - Anhanguera

== Paleoecology ==
Pterosaurs ranged from the Late Triassic to the end of the Cretaceous. The earliest known pterosaurs are from the late Triassic Period and provide insights into the origin and diversification of the group. Triassic pterosaurs, however, are rare. In 2014, just twenty-seven specimens were reported to be known, many consisting of a single bone. All but one, Arcticodactylus, come from the Alps.

In addition to Caelestiventus, the Saints & Sinners Quarry has produced a diverse vertebrate fauna including two sphenosuchian genera, two sphenodontian genera, a drepanosaurid, a procolophonid and two theropod dinosaurs – a coelophysoid and a medium-sized genus represented only by teeth. No invertebrates are known from the site. Plants from the quarry consist of Bennettitalean fronds.
