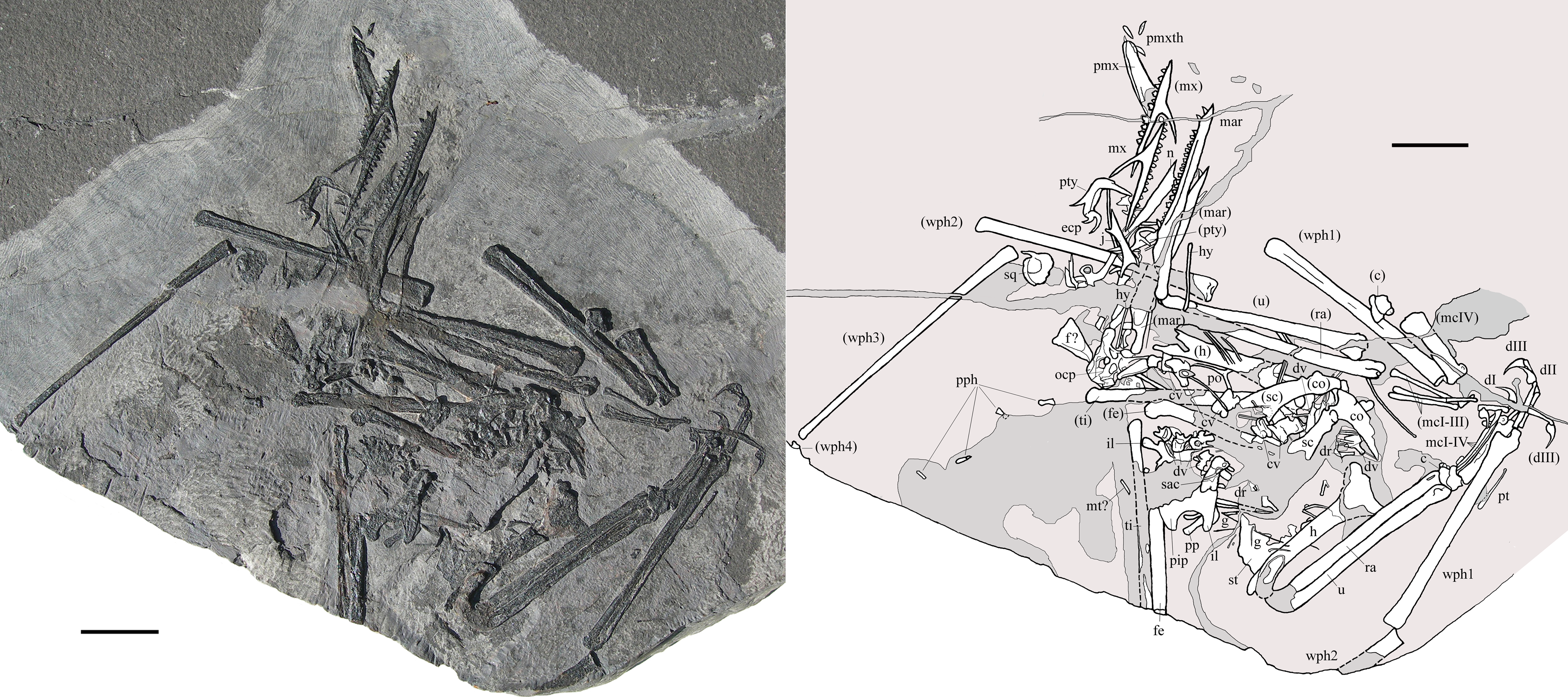
- Holotype specimen

Scientific classification
- Kingdom: Animalia
- Phylum: Chordata
- Class: Reptilia
- Clade: †Pterosauromorpha
- Order: †Pterosauria
- Clade: †Caviramidae
- Family: †Austriadraconidae
- Genus: †Seazzadactylus; Dalla Vecchia, 2019

Type species
- †Seazzadactylus venieri Dalla Vecchia, 2019

= Seazzadactylus =

Seazzadactylus Temporal range: Late Triassic, Norian

Genus of austriadraconid pterosaur from the Late Triassic

Seazzadactylus is a basal pterosaur genus that lived during the late Triassic (Norian stage, about 219-214 million years ago) in the area of present-day Italy.

== Discovery and naming ==
In 1997, amateur paleontologist Umberto Venier discovered the skeleton of a pterosaur in a boulder laying in the bed of the Seazza brook, just before it joins the Tagliamento river, near Preone in the Dolomites. Venier brought the find to the Museo Friulano di Storia Naturale at Udine. After partial preparation paleontologist Fabio Marco Dalla Vecchia announced the discovery in the scientific literature in 2000. In 2003, Dalla Vecchia referred the specimen to Eudimorphodon. In 2009 however, further preparation made him conclude that it was a species new to science, not identical to either Eudimorphodon or Carniadactylus.

In 2019, Dalla Vecchia named and described the type species Seazzadactylus venieri. The generic name combines that of the Seazza with the Greek daktylos, 'finger'. The specific name honours Venier as discoverer.

The holotype, MFSN 21545, was found in a layer of the Dolomia di Forni Formation dating from the middle to upper Norian. It consists of a partial skeleton with skull and lower jaws. The skeleton is not articulated but the bones are in close association. It lacks the tail and most feet bones. It represents a subadult individual, not fully grown.

== Description ==
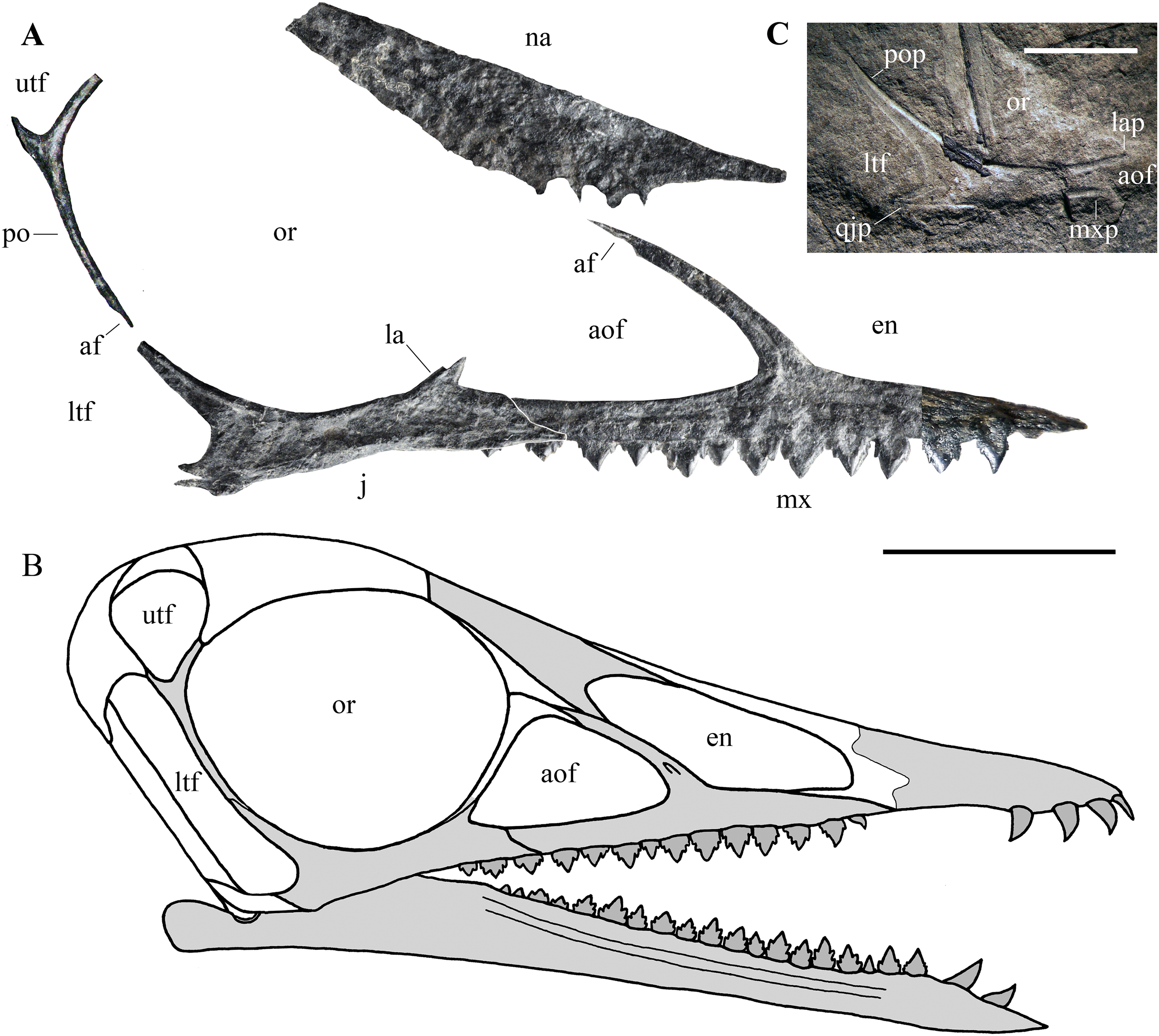
Reconstructed skull

Dalla Vecchia established a number of apomorphic traits. In the praemaxilla the teeth are limited to the front half of the body. The jugal bone has a high front branch, tapering to the front and below into a sharp needle-like point. The main body of the jugal bone is pierced in the middle by a large foramen. The front branch of the pterygoid bone makes a right angle to the outer side. The ectopterygoid bone is positioned behind the pterygoid and has a recurved outer side branch in the direction of the jugal as well as a rear branch. Teeth in the maxilla and the dentary bone possess multiple cusps, sometimes as high as six or seven, while erupted teeth with three cusps are absent. The first, second and third maxillary teeth are recurved, with the curvature gradually diminishing along the series. The shoulder blade is fan-like expanded to the rear. The pteroid bone is small and slender, formed like an exclamation mark.

== Phylogeny ==
Seazzadactylus was placed in the Pterosauria in 2019, in a basal position outside of the Monofenestrata. A cladistic analysis showed it was part of a yet-unnamed clade also containing Arcticodactylus, Austriadraco, Carniadactylus, Raeticodactylus and Caviramus. This unnamed clade was eventually named as Caviramidae in a 2020 study by Matthew G. Baron. In the evolutionary tree Seazzadactylus would be positioned directly above Austriadraco and below Carniadactylus. Eudimorphodon was not recovered as a close relative but in a more derived position instead, under Campylognathoides.

== See also ==
- Timeline of pterosaur research
