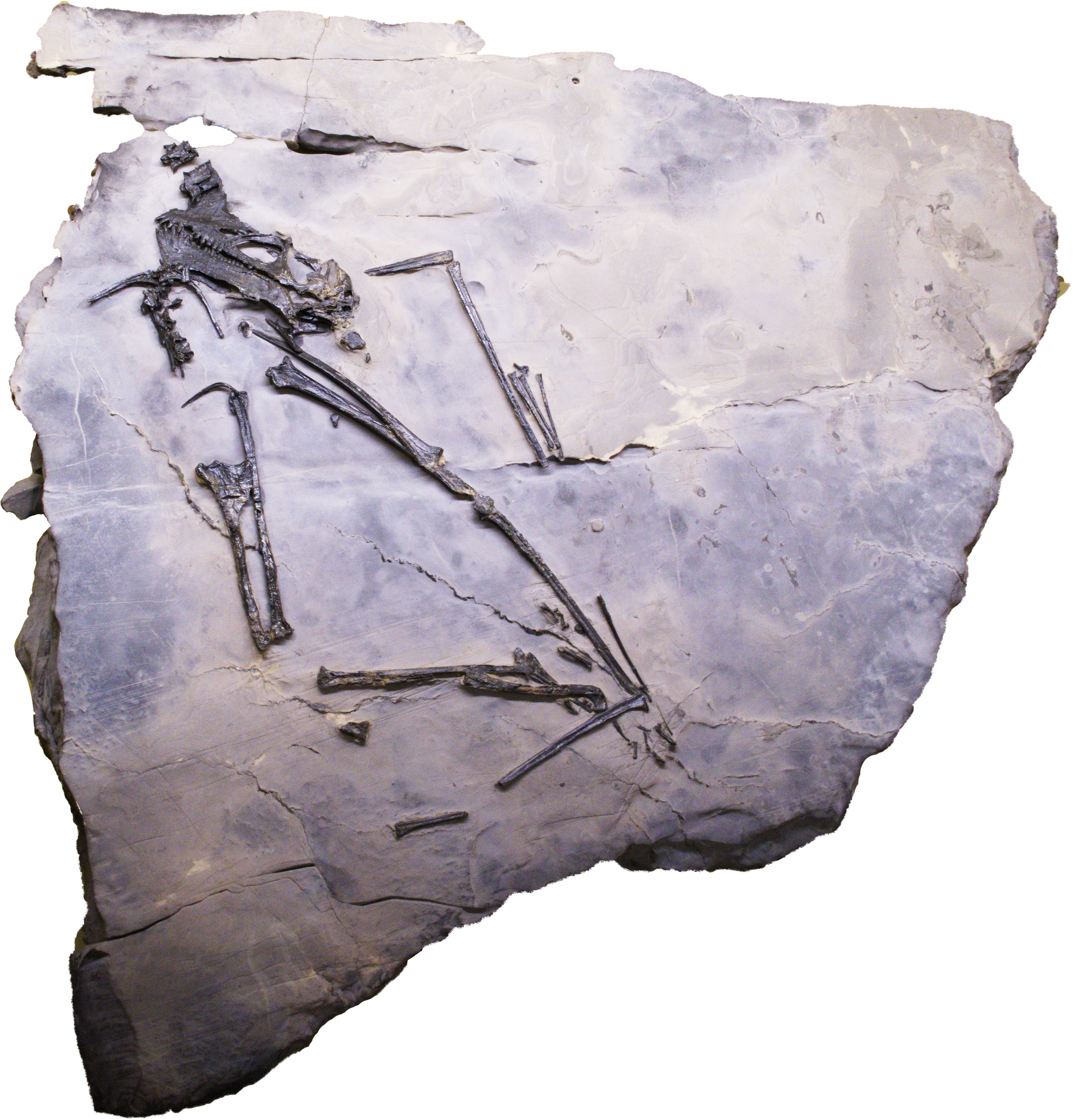
- Fossil of Raeticodactylus filisurensis

Scientific classification
- Kingdom: Animalia
- Phylum: Chordata
- Class: Reptilia
- Order: †Pterosauria
- Clade: †Eopterosauria
- Superfamily: †Eudimorphodontoidea
- Family: †Raeticodactylidae; Andres et al., 2014

Genera
- †Caviramus?; †Pachagnathus; †Raeticodactylus; †Yelaphomte

= Raeticodactylidae =

Raeticodactylids Temporal range: Late Triassic, 205 Ma

Family of eopterosaurs from the Late Triassic

Raeticodactylidae is a family of eudimorphodontoid eopterosaurian pterosaurs that lived in Switzerland during the Late Triassic. The family includes Caviramus, and the type genus Raeticodactylus, which are both known from the Kössen Formation, around 205 mya. Raeticodactylidae was first used in 2014 by Andres et al., as a group of all pterosaurs closer to Raeticodactylus than Eudimorphodon. The following phylogenetic analysis follows the topology of Andres et al. (2014).

- Eopterosauria
  - Preondactylia
    - Preondactylus buffarinii
    - Austriadactylus cristatus
  - - Peteinosaurus zambellii
    - Eudimorphodontoidea
      - Raeticodactylidae
        - Raeticodactylus filisurensis
        - Caviramus schesaplanensis
      - Eudimorphodontidae
        - Arcticodactylus cromptonellus
        - - Carniadactylus rosenfeldi
          - Eudimorphodon ranzii

In 2020 however, a study upheld by Matthew G. Baron about early pterosaur interrelationships found no evidence to support the existence of the clade Eopterosauria (the clade of which raeticodactylids might also belong to) as an early diverging clade within the Pterosauria, therefore, he sunk both Caviramus and Raeticodactylus within a clade he called Caviramidae.
