= Quebrada del Barro Formation =

Geologic formation in Argentina

- Stratigraphic range: Norian
- Type: Geological formation
- Unit of: Marayes Group
- Underlies: Los Riscos Formation
- Overlies: Carrizal Formation

Lithology
- Primary: Sandstone
- Other: Siltstone

Location
- Coordinates: 31.9°S 67.2°W
- Approximate paleocoordinates: 40.8°S 30.0°W
- Region: San Juan Province
- Country: Argentina
- Extent: Marayes-El Carrizal Basin
- Quebrada del Barro Formation (Argentina)

The Quebrada del Barro Formation is a geological formation of the Marayes-El Carrizal Basin in San Juan Province, Argentina. This formation is the most fossiliferous portion of the Triassic Marayes Group, and is also the youngest unit of the group, overlying the El Carrizal Formation. An unconformity at the top of the Quebrada del Barro Formation separates it from the Cretaceous-age Los Riscos Formation of the El Gigante Group. Part of the formation may be made into a provincial park following the discovery of the fossils of Ingentia, a giant sauropodomorph dinosaur which helped elucidate the early evolution of sauropods.

== Sedimentology ==
The Quebrada del Barro Formation formed within a rift basin during a period of renewed fracturing. It encompasses 600 to 1,400 metres (2,000 to 4,600 ft) of red sandstones, fine conglomerates, and diamictites. Early hypotheses on the depositional environment proposed that the sediments formed in an alluvial fan or braided river system, while a newer proposal outlines how four different facies within the formation can be used to reconstruct a meandering semiarid floodplain deposited by mudflows and discharging in heterolithic terminal splays.

== Fossil content ==
The fauna of Quebrada del Barro is similar to that of the neighboring Los Colorados Formation which is considered to be from the Norian stage of the Late Triassic. Both formations preserve fossils from groups such as sauropodomorph dinosaurs, cynodonts, and testudinatans. However, Quebrada del Barro is more abundant in sphenodontians (Sphenotitan), tritheledontid cynodonts, and coelophysoid dinosaurs (Lucianovenator), while sauropodomorphs are somewhat less common and aetosaurs are completely absent, in contrast to the Los Colorados Formation. Sphenodontians and cynodonts are also abundant in microfossil assemblages. In addition, the Quebrada del Barro Formation preserves some of the only pterosaur and Dromomeron specimens known from Triassic strata in Argentina. Although the sphenodontian and cynodont-dominated fauna of Quebrada del Barro is akin to that of the Faxinal del Sotorno assemblage of the Brazilian Caturrita Formation, the fauna of the Faxinal del Sotorno assemblage is otherwise indicative of an older part of the Triassic than the Quebrada del Barro Formation.

=== Dinosaurs ===
Theropods of the Quebrada del Barro Formation
Genus	Species	Material	Notes	Images
Lucianovenator	L. bonoi	Several specimens including vertebrae, hip fragments, and a partial tibia	A coelophysid theropod	

Sauropodomorphs of the Quebrada del Barro Formation
Taxon	Species	Material	Notes	Images
Ingentia	I. prima	"cervical and dorsal vertebrae, scapula"	A lessemsaurid sauropod	
Leyesaurus	L. marayensis		A massospondylid sauropodomorph. Known from uppermost layers which may belong to a different unit of Hettangian (Early Jurassic) age.	
Sauropodomorpha	sp.	Complete foot and tail vertebrae	Undiagnostic sauropodomorph remains originally referred to Riojasaurus	

=== Other avemetatarsalians ===
Non-dinosaur avemetatarsalias of the Quebrada del Barro Formation
Taxon	Species	Material	Notes	Images
Dromomeron	D. gigas	A partial femur	a lagerpetid	
Pachagnathus	P. benitoi	Snout fragment	A raeticodactylid pterosaur	
Pterosauria	sp.	Partial ulna	an indeterminate pterosaur	
Yelaphomte	Y. praderioi	Snout fragment	A raeticodactylid pterosaur	

=== Pseudosuchians ===
Pseudosuchias of the Quebrada del Barro Formation
Taxon	Species	Material	Notes	Images
"Rauisuchidae"	sp.	Skull fragments, osteoderms	an indeterminate "rauisuchid" smaller than Fasolasuchus	
Crocodylomorpha	sp.	A specimen including a partial osteoderm and vertebrae fragments	Indeterminate, possibly a "sphenosuchid"	
Crocodylomorpha	sp.	Two incomplete specimens including osteoderms, vertebrae, and other bones	a protosuchid, possibly synonymous with Hemiprotosuchus	

=== Rhynchocephalians ===
Rhynchocephalians of the Quebrada del Barro Formation
Genus	Species	Material	Notes	Images
Sphenotitan	S. leyesi	numerous specimens (~50% of all recovered fossils)	an eilenodontine sphenodontian	

=== Other reptiles ===
Other reptiles of the Quebrada del Barro Formation
Taxon	Species	Material	Notes	Images
Archosauriformes	sp.	Maxilla, caudal vertebra, metatarsal, indeterminate limb bone (tibia?)	Various indeterminate fragments likely belonging to pseudosuchians or dinosauromorphs	
Waluchelys	W. cavitesta	2 partial skeletons and carapaces	an australochelyid stem-turtle	

=== Synapsids ===
Synapsids of the Quebrada del Barro Formation
Taxon	Species	Material	Notes	Images
Tritheledontidae	sp.	36 specimens, including a partial skeleton	an undescribed tritheledontid cynodont. May be two taxa based on two morphotypes: "long-snout" and "short-snout".	
