= List of pterosaur type specimens =

This list of pterosaur type specimens is a list of fossils serving as the official standard-bearers for inclusion in the species and genera of the reptile clade Pterosauria, which includes the famous winged reptiles of the Mesozoic. Type specimens are definitionally members of biological taxa, and additional specimens can only be "referred" to these taxa if an expert deems them sufficiently similar to the type.

== The list ==
| Species | Genus | Nickname | Catalogue number | Institution | Age | Unit | Country | Notes | Images |
|---|---|---|---|---|---|---|---|---|---|
| Arcticodactylus cromptonellus | Arcticodactylus | N/A | MGUH VP 3393 | | | | | | |
