= Austriadraco =

Austriadraco Temporal range: Late Triassic, 217–213 Ma

Scientific classification
- Kingdom: Animalia
- Phylum: Chordata
- Class: Reptilia
- Order: †Pterosauria
- Clade: †Caviramidae
- Family: †Austriadraconidae; Kellner, 2015
- Genus: †Austriadraco; Kellner, 2015

Type species
- †Austriadraco dallavecchiai Kellner, 2015

Genus of pterosaur from the Late Triassic

Austriadraco is a genus of pterosaur living during the Late Triassic (Norian stage, 217-213 million years ago) in the area of present Austria. Its only species—Austriadraco dallavecchiai—was previously attributed to Eudimorphodon, and its closest relatives may have been Eudimorphodon or Arcticodactylus.

== Discovery ==
In June 1994, near Seefeld in Austrian Tirol, at a 1600 metres high mountain trail to the Reither Spitze, in the vicinity of the Reither Joch-Alm, Bernd Lammerer discovered a pterosaur skeleton. The remains have been secured as five stone plates, removed on several occasions. In 2003, Peter Wellnhofer identified the fossil as a specimen of Eudimorphodon, a cf. E. ranzii. As it was 10 to 25% shorter than the latter's holotype, Wellnhofer considered it a juvenile. The same year Fabio Marco Dalla Vecchia doubted the comparability to E. ranzii and suggested that it represent a separate Eudimorphodon species. In 2009, Dalla Vecchia concluded that the specimen was neither a juvenile nor closely related to Eudimorphodon.

In 2015, Alexander Kellner named the separate genus Austriadraco, with the type species Austriadraco dallavecchiai. The generic name is a combination of the Latin words Austria and draco, "dragon". The specific name honours Dalla Vecchia. The Life Science Identifiers are for the genus 120B3003-6DE3-41B4-AF6B-6F242FB2A777 and for the species 6E123721-07EA-419CB755-9981CC7D9209.

The holotype, BSP 1994 I 51, was found in a layer of the Seefeld Formation, dating from the late Norian. It consists of a partial and disarticulated skeleton with skull. It contains both frontal bones, a left jugal, the lower jaws, loose teeth, vertebrae of the neck, back and tail, the shoulder girdle, both humeri, a first wing phalanx, the pelvis, a shinbone and a calf bone. The fused frontals had in 2003 been incorrectly identified as a breast bone by Wellnhofer. The bones have been partly preserved as impressions only and many are fragmented. The fossil is part of the collection of the Bayerische Staatssammlung für Paläontologie und historische Geologie at Munich.

== Description ==
Austriadraco dallavecchiai is a small species. Humerus length is about four centimetres. In 2015 Kellner indicated several distinguishing traits. Some of these are autapomorphies. The frontal bone has a short front branch. The jugal bone has short branches to the front, in the direction of the maxilla and the nasal bone, and a long narrow upwards branch running towards the postorbital bone. In the outer rear side of the lower jaw an opening is present, the mandibular fenestra. The coronoid process of the surangular bone is low. The shoulder blade is considerably longer, 62%, than the coracoid.

Additionally, a unique combination of in themselves not unique traits is present. The coracoid is broad, with a constricted shaft. In the pelvis, the ischipubic plate, the fusion of the pubic bone with the ischium, is deep. The shinbone is relatively long, with a length of 57.7 millimetres attaining 70% of the length of the humerus and 92% of the length of the first phalanx of the (fourth) wingfinger.

== Classification ==
According to Dalla Vecchia's analysis, Austriadraco would have a very basal position in the Pterosauria. Kellner concluded that its affinities were uncertain and placed Austriadraco in a separate, undefined, Austriadraconidae. He suggested a close relationship with Arcticodactylus as both taxa shared the trait of a short coracoid. In 2020, a study upheld by Matthew G. Baron about early pterosaur interrelationships found Austriadraco to group with Carniadactylus, Raeticodactylus, and the Austriadraconidae, which in turn were within a clade called Caviramidae.

== See also ==
- List of pterosaur genera
