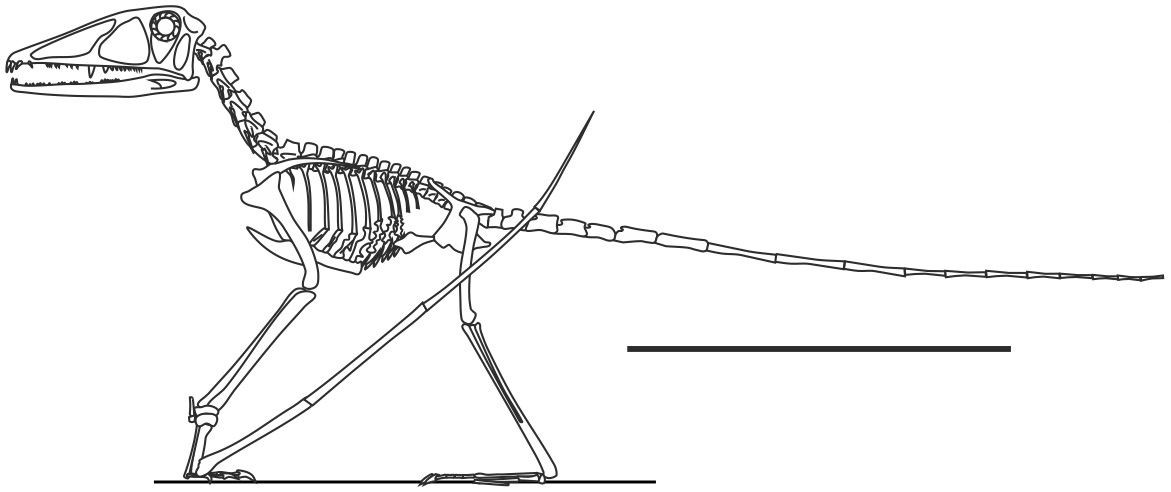
- Preondactylus skeletal restoration

Scientific classification
- Kingdom: Animalia
- Phylum: Chordata
- Class: Reptilia
- Order: †Pterosauria
- Clade: †Eopterosauria; Andres et al., 2014

Subgroups
- †Austriadraco; †Peteinosaurus?; †Preondactylia?; †Austriadactylus; †Preondactylus; †Eudimorphodontoidea; †Eudimorphodontidae; †Raeticodactylidae

= Eopterosauria =

Eopterosauria Temporal range: Triassic, 228–201 Ma

Clade of basal pterosaurs

Eopterosauria is a proposed clade of basal pterosaurs from the Triassic. The term was first used in Andres et al. (2014) to include Preondactylus, Austriadactylus, Peteinosaurus and Eudimorphodontidae. Inside the group were two other new clades, Preondactylia, which included Preondactylus and Austriadactylus, and Eudimorphodontoidea, to include Eudimorphodontidae and Raeticodactylidae. Eopterosauria was defined as "the least inclusive clade containing Preondactylus buffarinii and Eudimorphodon ranzii". The specimen BSP 1994, previously assigned to Eudimorphodon, was named the separate taxon Austriadraco in 2015, and assigned to the new family Austriadraconidae, but further classification was not described. The following phylogenetic analysis follows the topology of Andres et al. (2014).

- Eopterosauria
  - Preondactylia
    - Preondactylus buffarinii
    - Austriadactylus cristatus
  - - Peteinosaurus zambellii
    - Eudimorphodontoidea
      - Raeticodactylidae
        - Raeticodactylus filisurensis
        - Caviramus schesaplanensis
      - Eudimorphodontidae
        - Arcticodactylus cromptonellus
        - - Carniadactylus rosenfeldi
          - Eudimorphodon ranzii

In a 2020 study of early pterosaur interrelationships carried out by Matthew G. Baron concluded that Eopterosauria and Eudimorphodontidae are not monophyletic groups, and instead he created the family Caviramidae to contain most of the prior eudimorphodontids and basal eopterosaurians while Eudimorphodon and Peteinosaurus belonged to a clade named Zambellisauria alongside more advanced pterosaurs. Additionally, Baron included the clade Austriadraconidae as a subgroup within the Caviramidae to include three genera: Arcticodactylus, Austriadraco, and Seazzadactylus.

- Pterosauria
  - Preondactylia
    - Preondactylus
    - Austriadactylus
  - - Caviramidae
      - Austriadraconidae
        - Arcticodactylus
        - - Austriadraco
          - Seazzadactylus
      - - Carniadactylus
        - - MCSNB 8950
          - Caviramus
          - Raeticodactylus
    - Zambellisauria
      - Peteinosaurus
      - - Dimorphodontia
        - - Eudimorphodon
          - Novialoidea
