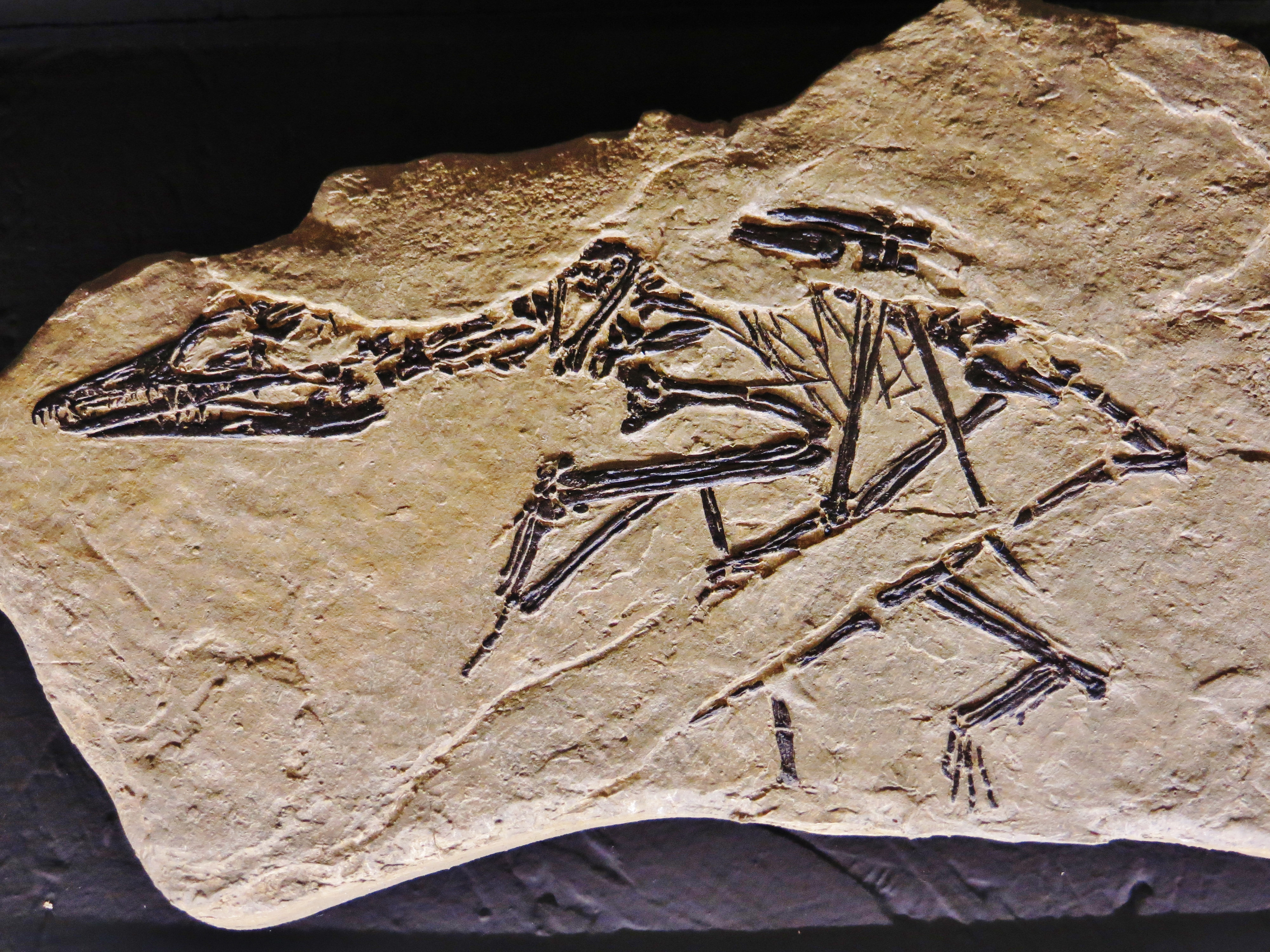
- Fossil cast

Scientific classification
- Kingdom: Animalia
- Phylum: Chordata
- Class: Reptilia
- Order: †Pterosauria
- Clade: †Preondactylia
- Genus: †Preondactylus; Wild, 1984
- Species: †P. buffarinii

Binomial name
- †Preondactylus buffarinii Wild, 1984

= Preondactylus =

Preondactylus Temporal range: Late Triassic, Carnian or Norian

Genus of preondactylian pterosaur from the Late Triassic

Preondactylus is a genus of long-tailed pterosaurs from the Late Triassic (Carnian-Norian or late Norian, about 217–214 million years ago) that inhabited what is now Italy. It contains a single known species, Preondactylus buffarinii, which was discovered by Nando Buffarini in 1982 at the Forni Dolostone near Udine in the Preone valley of the Italian Alps.

== Discovery ==
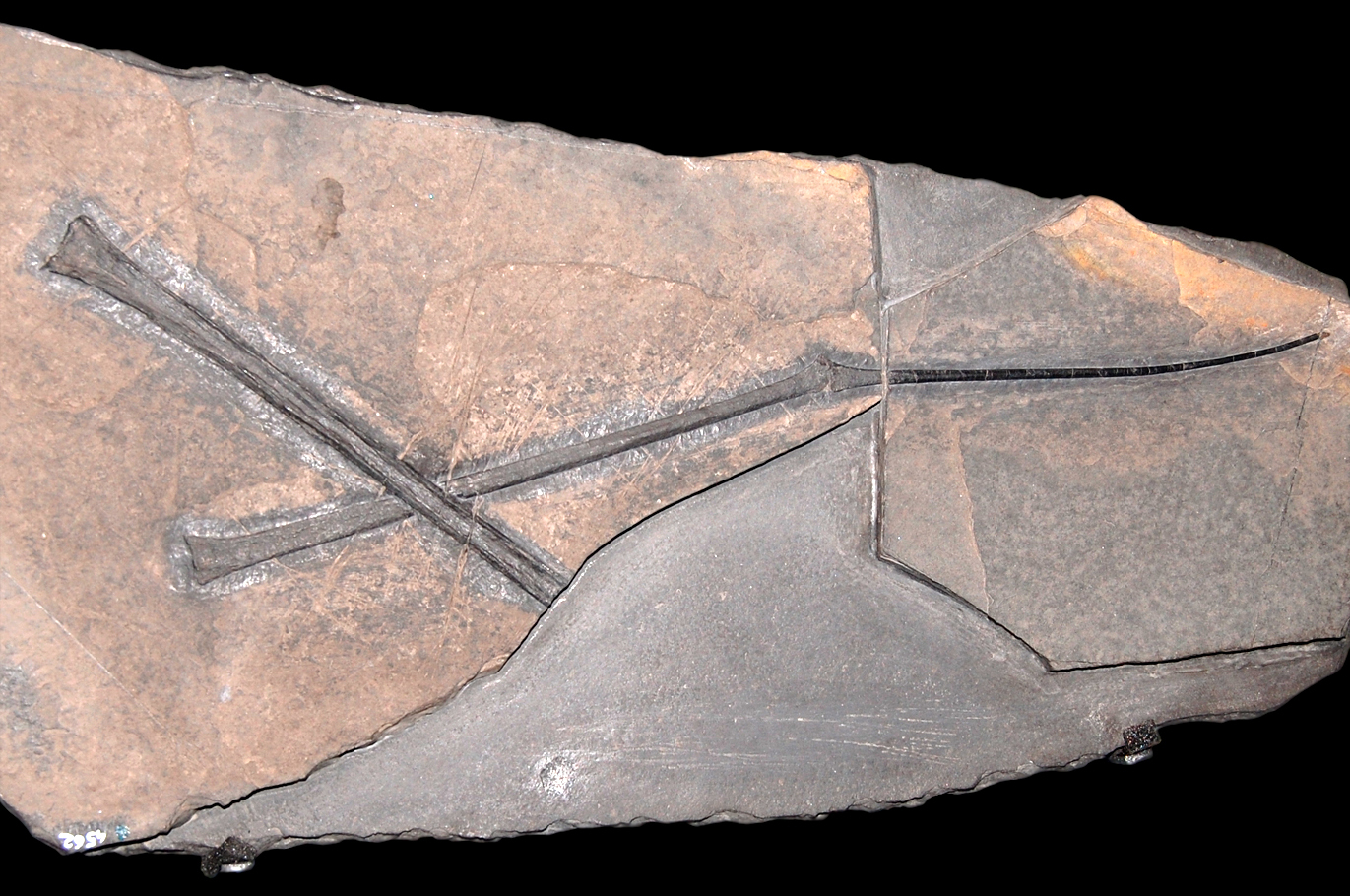
Fossil wing bones

When Buffarini first discovered Preondactylus, the thin slab of bituminous, dolomitic limestone containing the fossil was accidentally broken into pieces while being extracted. After reassembly the rock was cleaned with water by him and his wife and the marl and in it the bone was washed away and lost. All that was left was a negative imprint on the stone, of which a silicone rubber cast was made to allow for subsequent study of the otherwise lost remains. Most of the skeleton is known, but the posterior portions of the skull have not been preserved. This first specimen is the holotype: MFSN-1770.

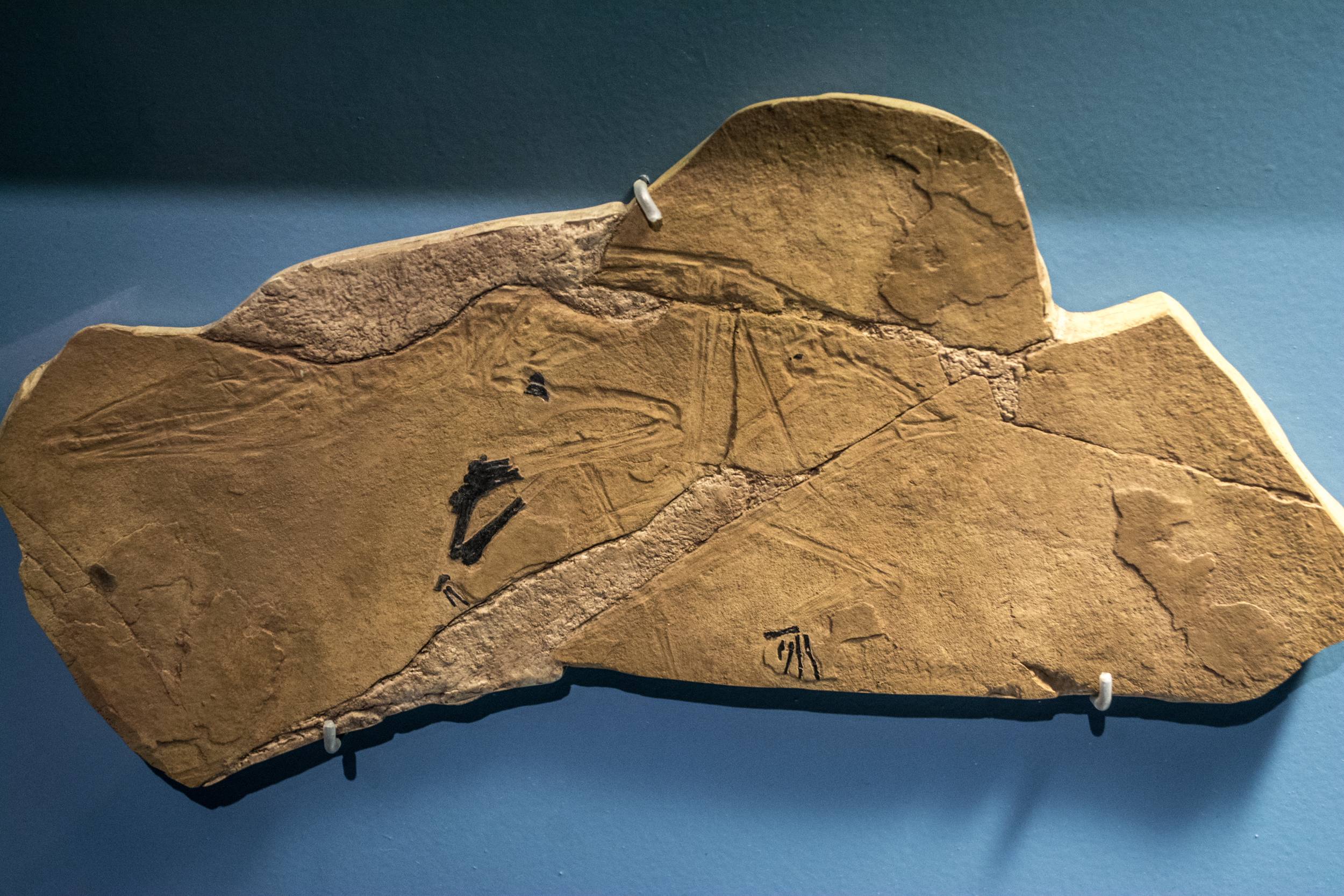
Cast of a Preondactylus buffarinii

A second, disarticulated specimen, MFSN-1891, was found at the same locale in 1984 about 150–200 meters (490–660 ft) deeper into the strata than the original find. The second specimen appears to have been preserved in the gastric pellet of a predatory fish, which had consumed the pterosaur and vomited up the indigestible pieces that would later fossilize. More detailed knowledge of the variability of Triassic pterosaurs has made the identification of this specimen as Preondactylus uncertain, and it may even be that the remains are not those of a pterosaur at all.

A third specimen is MFSN 25161, a partial skull, lacking the lower jaws.

== Description ==
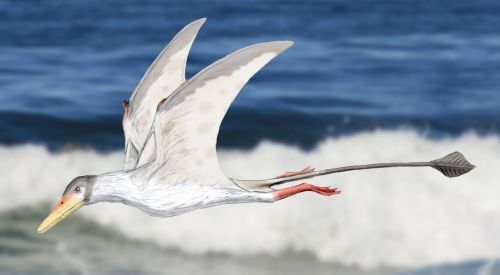
Restoration

Preondactylus had single cusp teeth, meaning they had one point on each tooth. Because its teeth were monocuspid, pointed, and widely spaced apart, they did not occlude; tooth wear was thus absent in Preondactylus. Its diet either consisted of fish, insects or both, but there is still debate going on as the tooth structure could indicate either diet (or both). The holotype had a wingspan of 45 cm (1.48 ft), while a larger referred specimen is estimated to have a wingspan of 1.5 m (4.9 ft). The short wings are considered a "primitive" feature for pterosaurs, but Preondactylus was a fully developed flier.

== Phylogeny ==
The species was described and named by Rupert Wild in 1984. The genus name refers to Preone, the specific name honours Buffarini. Rupert classified the new species within Rhamphorhynchidae, of which group very old species are known such as Dorygnathus, but soon it was understood the form was much more basal. A cladistic analysis by David Unwin found Preondactylus as the most basal pterosaur, and the species was accordingly used by him for a node clade definition of the clade Pterosauria. Other analyses however, have found a somewhat more derived position for Preondactylus.

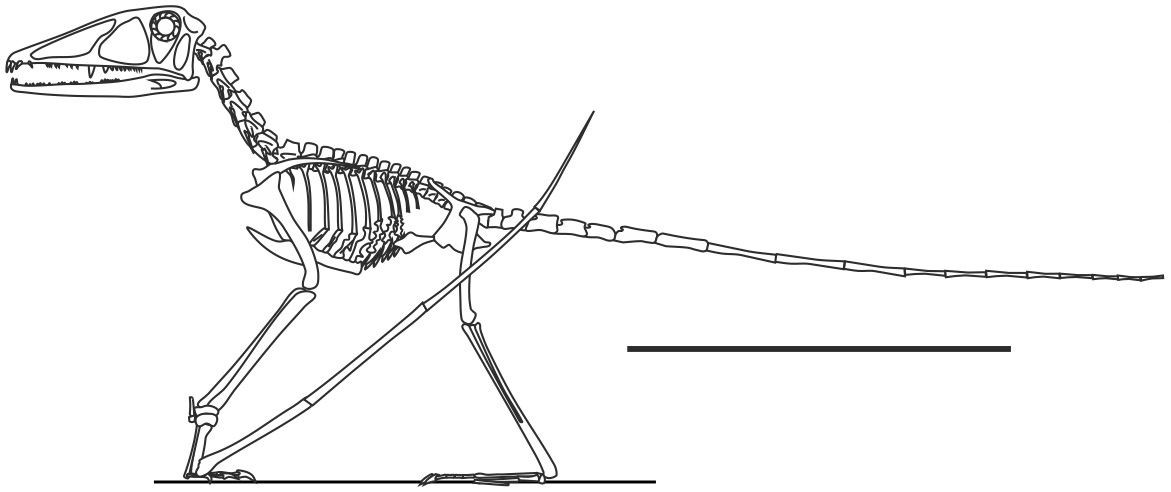
Skeletal restoration

The following phylogenetic analysis follows the topology of Upchurch et al. (2015).

- Eopterosauria
  - - Preondactylus buffarinii
    - Austriadactylus cristatus
  - - Peteinosaurus zambellii
    - Eudimorphodontidae
      - Raeticodactylinae
        - Raeticodactylus filisurensis
        - Caviramus schesaplanensis
      - Eudimorphodontinae
        - Arcticodactylus cromptonellus
        - - Carniadactylus rosenfeldi
          - Eudimorphodon ranzii

== See also ==
- List of pterosaur genera
- Timeline of pterosaur research

== Literature ==
- Wild, R (1984). "A new pterosaur (Reptilia, Pterosauria) from the Upper Triassic (Norian) of Friuli, Italy". Gortiana — Atti Museo Friuliano di Storia Naturale. 5: 45–62.
- Dalla Vecchia, F.M.; Muscio, G.; Wild, R. (1988). "Pterosaur remains in a gastric pellet from the Upper Triassic (Norian) of Rio Seazza Valley (Udine, Italy)". Gortiana — Atti Museo Friuliano di Storia Naturale. 10: 121–132.
- Dalla Vecchia F.M., 1998, "New observations on the osteology and taxonomic status of Preondactylus buffarinii Wild, 1984 (Reptilia, Pterosauria)", Boll. Soc. Paleont. It., 36(3, 1997): 355-366
- Dalla Vecchia, Fabio M. (2003). "A Review of the Triassic Pterosaur Record". Riv. Mus. Civ. Sc. Nat. "E. Caffi" Bergamo. 22: 13–29.
