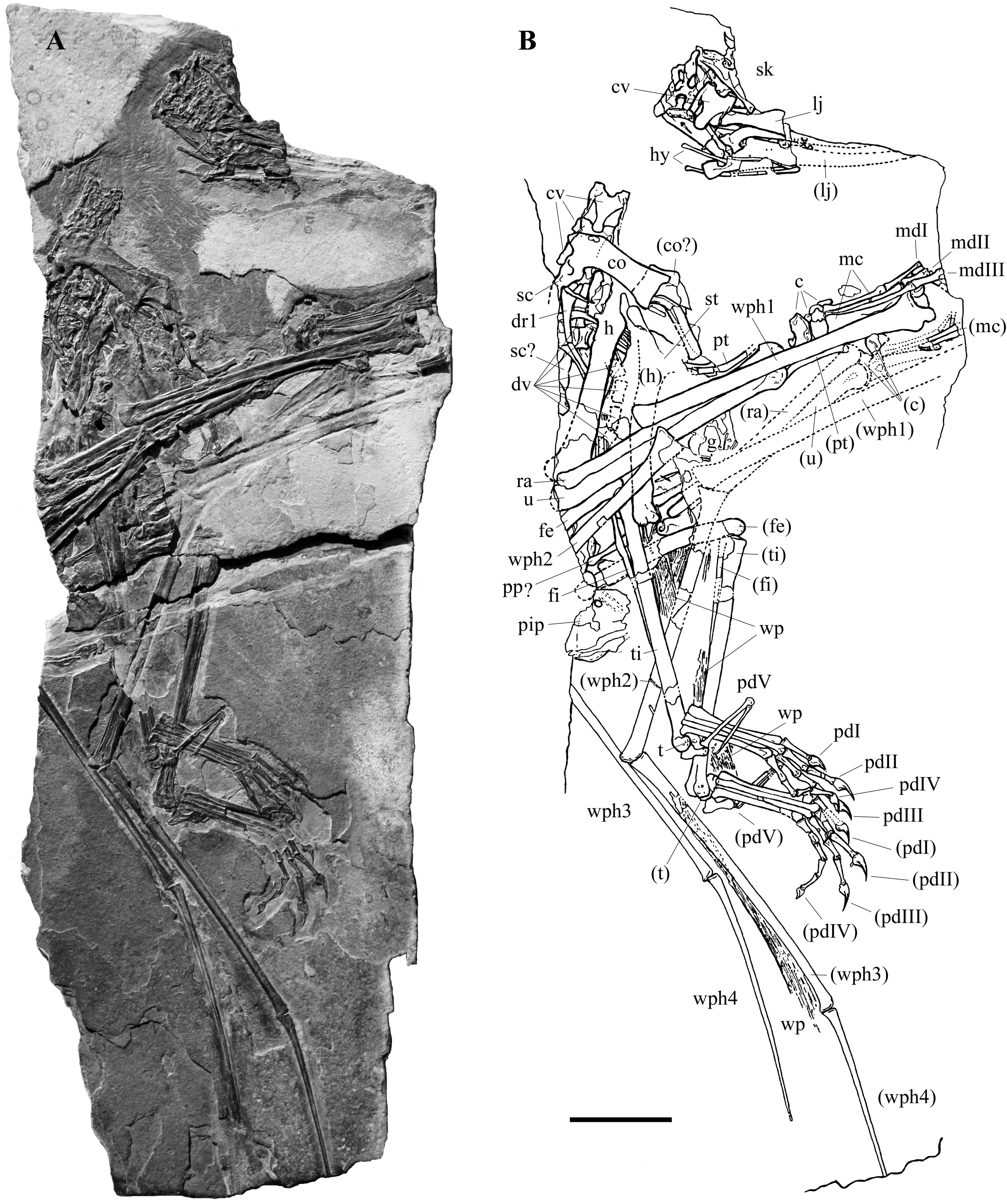
- Holotype

Scientific classification
- Kingdom: Animalia
- Phylum: Chordata
- Class: Reptilia
- Order: †Pterosauria
- Family: †Eudimorphodontidae
- Subfamily: †Eudimorphodontinae
- Genus: †Carniadactylus; Dalla Vecchia, 2009
- Species: †C. rosenfeldi

Binomial name
- †Carniadactylus rosenfeldi (Dalla Vecchia, 1995)

Synonyms
- Eudimorphodon rosenfeldi Dalla Vecchia, 1995; Bergamodactylus wildi Kellner, 2015

= Carniadactylus =

Carniadactylus Temporal range: Late Triassic, 217–213 Ma

Genus of Triassic pterosaur

Carniadactylus is a genus of pterosaur which existed in Europe during the Late Triassic period (Norian stage, about 217-213 million years ago). The genus contains a single species, Carniadactylus rosenfeldi.

== Discovery and naming ==
In 1995 the Italian paleontologist Fabio Marco Dalla Vecchia named a new species of the genus Eudimorphodon: E. rosenfeldi. The specific name honors the finder Corrado Rosenfeld. The holotype was MFSN 1797, a partial fossil skeleton with parts of the skull and lower jaws, but lacking the tail, found near Udine.

It soon became clear that in cladistic analyses, E. rosenfeldi was not the sister taxon of the type species of Eudimorphodon: E. ranzii. This made the genus paraphyletic or polyphyletic, depending on the precise analysis. To avoid this, Dalla Vecchia created the new genus Carniadactylus in 2009. The type species is Carniadactylus rosenfeldi. The genus name is derived from Carnia, the name of the region the fossil was found, and Greek daktylos, "finger", a reference to the wing finger typical of pterosaurs. A second specimen, MPUM 6009, is the paratype, consisting of an almost complete skeleton that, however, has been largely preserved as an impression only. It is a third shorter than the holotype, which itself indicated a wingspan of about seventy centimetres. The disparity was explained by Dalla Vecchia as intraspecific variability.

=== "Bergamodactylus" ===
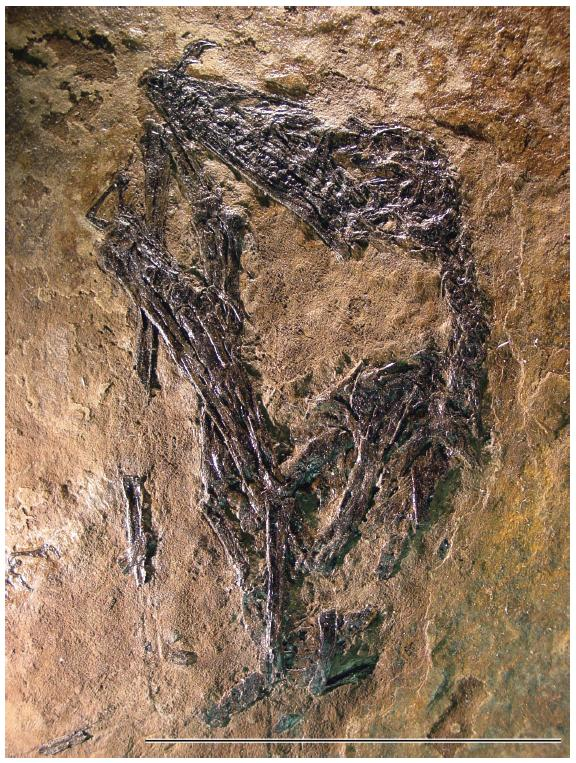
Specimen MPUM 6009, which Kellner considered the separate genus Bergamodactylus

In 1978, Rupert Wild described a small pterosaur specimen in the collection of the Museo di Paleontologia dell´Università di Milano, found near Cene, Lombardy. He referred to it as the "Milan Exemplar" and identified it as a juvenile of Eudimorphodon ranzii. The specimen, MPUM 6009, was found in a layer of the Calcari di Zorzino Formation dating from the early Norian (upper Alaunian). It consists of a partial skeleton including the skull, compressed on a single plate. It is largely articulated and includes the lower jaws, most of the wings, much of the vertebral column except the tail, and hindlimb elements. Some bones have only been preserved as impressions. Wild noted considerable differences with the type specimen of Eudimorphodon but these were explained as reflecting the young age of the animal.

Fabio Marco Dalla Vecchia and Alexander Kellner concluded the specimen must have been at least subadult in view of the fusion of the scapula and the coracoid, the upper wrist bones being fused into a syncarpal, and the fusion of the extensor process on the first wing phalanx. Dalla Vecchia referred the specimen to Carniadactylus rosenfeldi. Kellner later concluded that the Milan Exemplar represented a different species from Carniadactylus. He argued it showed differences in build that could not be explained by individual variation; it was much smaller, though of similar age, and it was of a younger geological age. In 2015, he named it as the separate genus and species Bergamodactylus wildi. The generic name combines a reference to Bergamo with a Greek δάκτυλος, daktylos, "finger", a usual suffix in pterosaur names since Pterodactylus. The specific name honours Wild. Kellner placed Bergamodactylus, within the Novialoidea, in the Campylognathoidea.

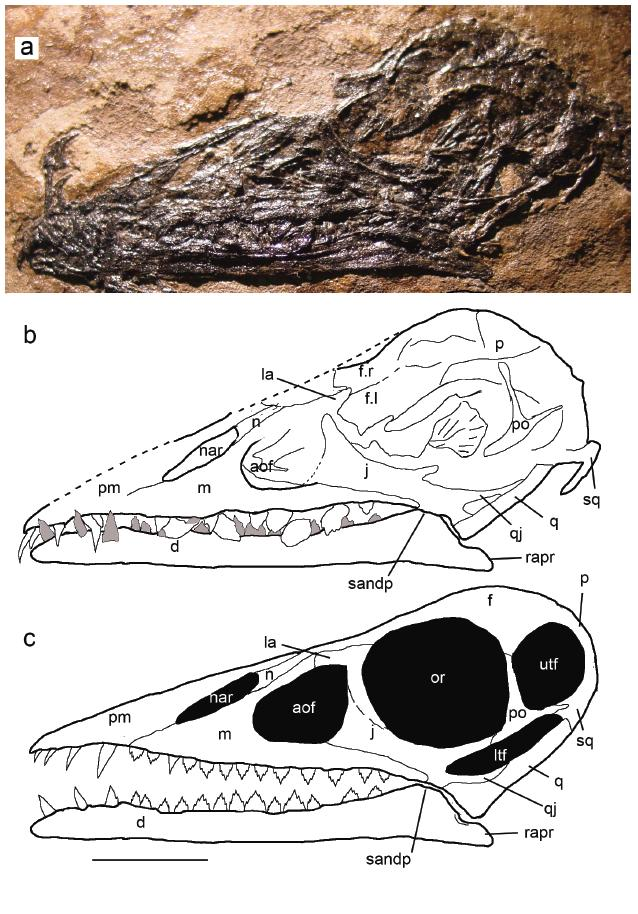
Skull of the subadult "Bergamodactylus" specimen

In 2018, Dalla Vecchia argued that Kellner's observations on development in pterosaurs were oversimplified, and that the Milan Exemplar's distinguishing features were ambiguous, invalid, or individual variation at best. As a result, Dalla Vecchia referred the specimen back to Carniadactylus, rendering Bergamodactylus wildi a junior synonym of Carniadactylus rosenfeldi.

== Description ==
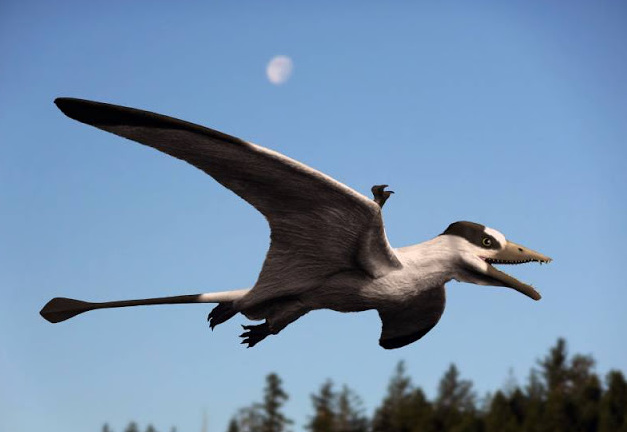
Life restoration

Carniadactylus was similar in appearance and anatomy to its close relative Eudimorphodon, though it was significantly smaller. Like Eudimorphodon, it is notable for its complex multi-cusped teeth. Despite their similarities, the size difference between these two pterosaurs likely meant that they occupied different niches and relied on different food sources. This is supported by studies of their teeth. While similar in construction, the teeth of Carniadactylus show little to no wear, unlike the larger, fish-eating Eudimorphodon, which may have been able to chew its food. The smaller Carniadactylus probably fed on smaller, soft-bodied prey like worms and insect larvae.

== Classification ==
According to earlier analyses by Alexander Kellner, Carniadactylus was thought to be related to Peteinosaurus within the Dimorphodontidae. David Unwin later placed it into the Campylognathoididae. This was supported by an analysis by Dalla Vecchia that showed Carniadactylus as the sister taxon of Caviramus. However, a more thorough phylogenetic analysis by Andres & Myers in 2013 supported the original interpretation of Carniadactylus as the sister taxon to the type species of Eudimorphodon, and they reclassified it within that genus. The following phylogenetic analysis follows the topology of Upchurch et al. (2015).

- Eopterosauria
  - - Preondactylus buffarinii
    - Austriadactylus cristatus
  - - Peteinosaurus zambellii
    - Eudimorphodontoidea
      - Raeticodactylidae
        - Raeticodactylus filisurensis
        - Caviramus schesaplanensis
      - Eudimorphodontidae
        - Arcticodactylus cromptonellus
        - - Carniadactylus rosenfeldi
          - Eudimorphodon ranzii

In 2020 however, a study upheld by Matthew G. Baron about early pterosaur interrelationships found Carniadactylus to group with Caviramus, Raeticodactylus, and the Austriadraconidae, which in turn were within a clade called Caviramidae.

== See also ==
- List of pterosaur genera
- Timeline of pterosaur research
