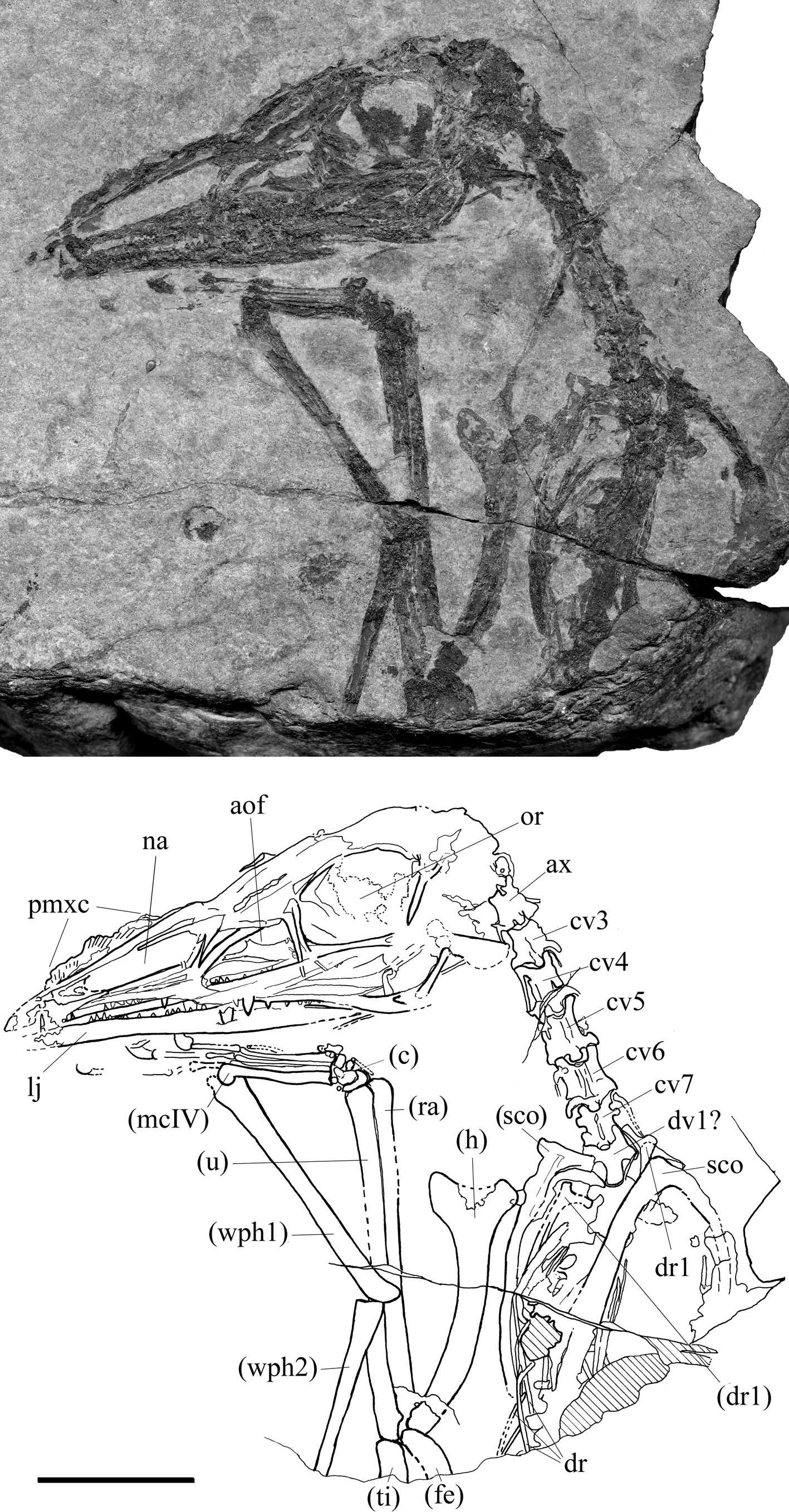
- Skeleton

Scientific classification
- Kingdom: Animalia
- Phylum: Chordata
- Class: Reptilia
- Order: †Pterosauria
- Clade: †Preondactylia
- Genus: †Austriadactylus; Dalla Vecchia et al., 2002
- Species: †A. cristatus

Binomial name
- †Austriadactylus cristatus Dalla Vecchia et al., 2002

= Austriadactylus =

Austriadactylus Temporal range: Late Triassic, 215 Ma

Genus of Triassic pterosaur

Austriadactylus is a genus of primitive pterosaur. The fossil remains were unearthed in Late Triassic (middle Norian age, about 215 million years ago) rocks of Austria.

== Discovery ==
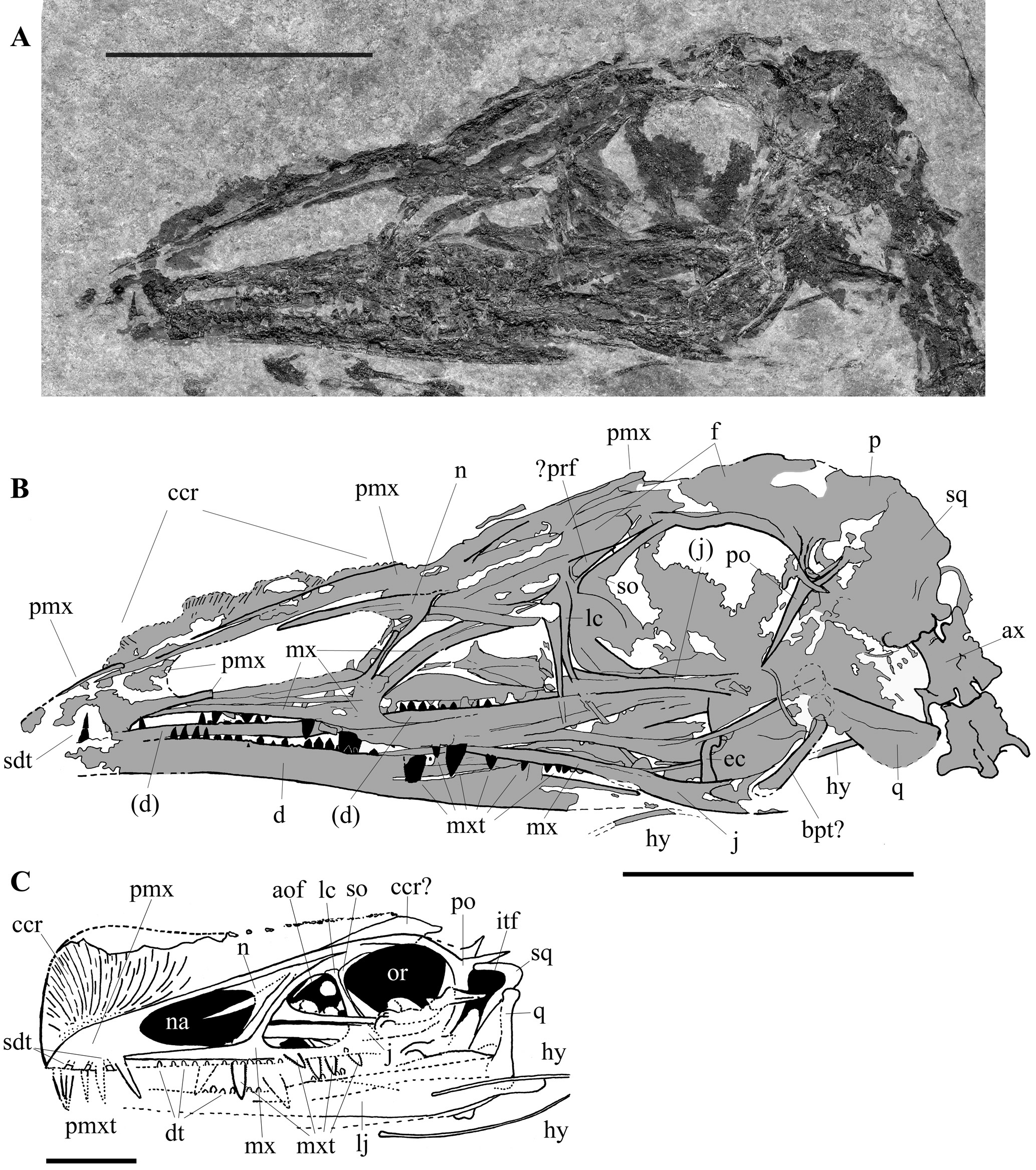
Skull

The genus was named in 2002 by Fabio Marco Dalla Vecchia and colleagues. The type species is Austriadactylus cristatus. The genus name is derived from Latin Austria and Greek daktylos, "finger", in reference to the wing finger of pterosaurs. The specific epithet means "crested" in Latin, a reference to the skull crest.

The genus is based on holotype SMNS 56342, a crushed partial skeleton on a slab, found in an abandoned mine near Ankerschlag in Tyrol, in the Norian Seefelder Beds. The counterslab has been lost and with it some of the bone. The fossil consists of the skull, lower jaws, some vertebrae, parts of the limbs and pelvic girdle, and the first part of the tail.

== Description ==
The elongated skull has a length of 11 cm. It carried a bony crest that widened as it descended towards the snout, up to a height of 2 cm. The triangular nares formed the largest skull openings. The also triangular fenestrae antorbitales are smaller than the orbits. The teeth differ in shape, and the species was thus heterodont. Most teeth are small and tricuspid or three-pointed. In the front of the upper jaw, five larger recurved teeth with a single point form a prey grab; six or seven such teeth are also interspersed with the smaller teeth more to the back of the mouth. There are at least seventeen and perhaps as many as 25 tricuspid teeth in the upper jaw, for a total of perhaps 74 teeth of all sizes in the skull. The number of teeth in the lower jaws cannot be determined.

The flexible tail did not have the stiffening rod-like vertebral extensions present in other basal pterosaurs. The wingspan has been estimated at 120 cm.

== Classification ==
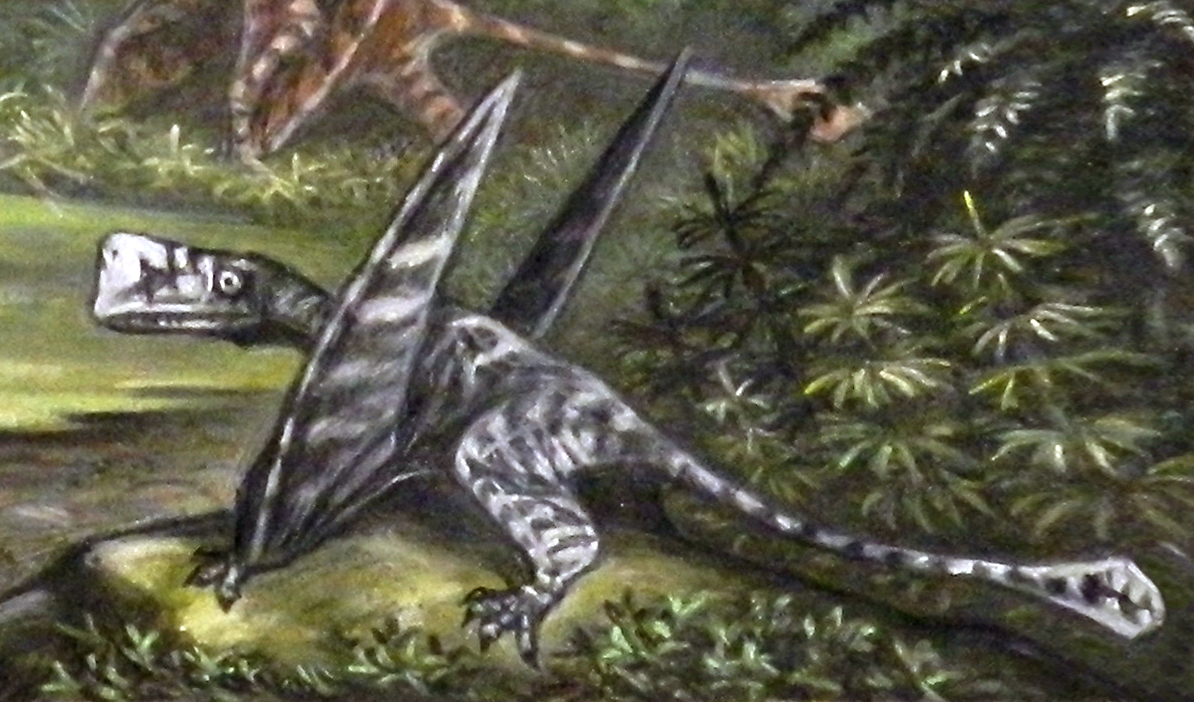
Life restoration

Austriadactylus was in 2002 assigned by the describers to a general Pterosauria incertae sedis, but some later analyses showed it to have been related to Campylognathoides and Eudimorphodon in the Campylognathoididae. It has even been suggested it was a junior synonym of Eudimorphodon, though perhaps a distinct species in that genus. The following phylogenetic analysis follows the topology of Upchurch et al. (2015).

- Eopterosauria
  - - Preondactylus buffarinii
    - Austriadactylus cristatus
  - - Peteinosaurus zambellii
    - Eudimorphodontidae
      - Raeticodactylinae
        - Raeticodactylus filisurensis
        - Caviramus schesaplanensis
      - Eudimorphodontinae
        - Arcticodactylus cromptonellus
        - - Carniadactylus rosenfeldi
          - Eudimorphodon ranzii

== Palaeoecology ==
The dental microwear textures of Austriadactylus provide indications that the diet of the genus primarily consisted of hard invertebrates.

== See also ==
- Timeline of pterosaur research
