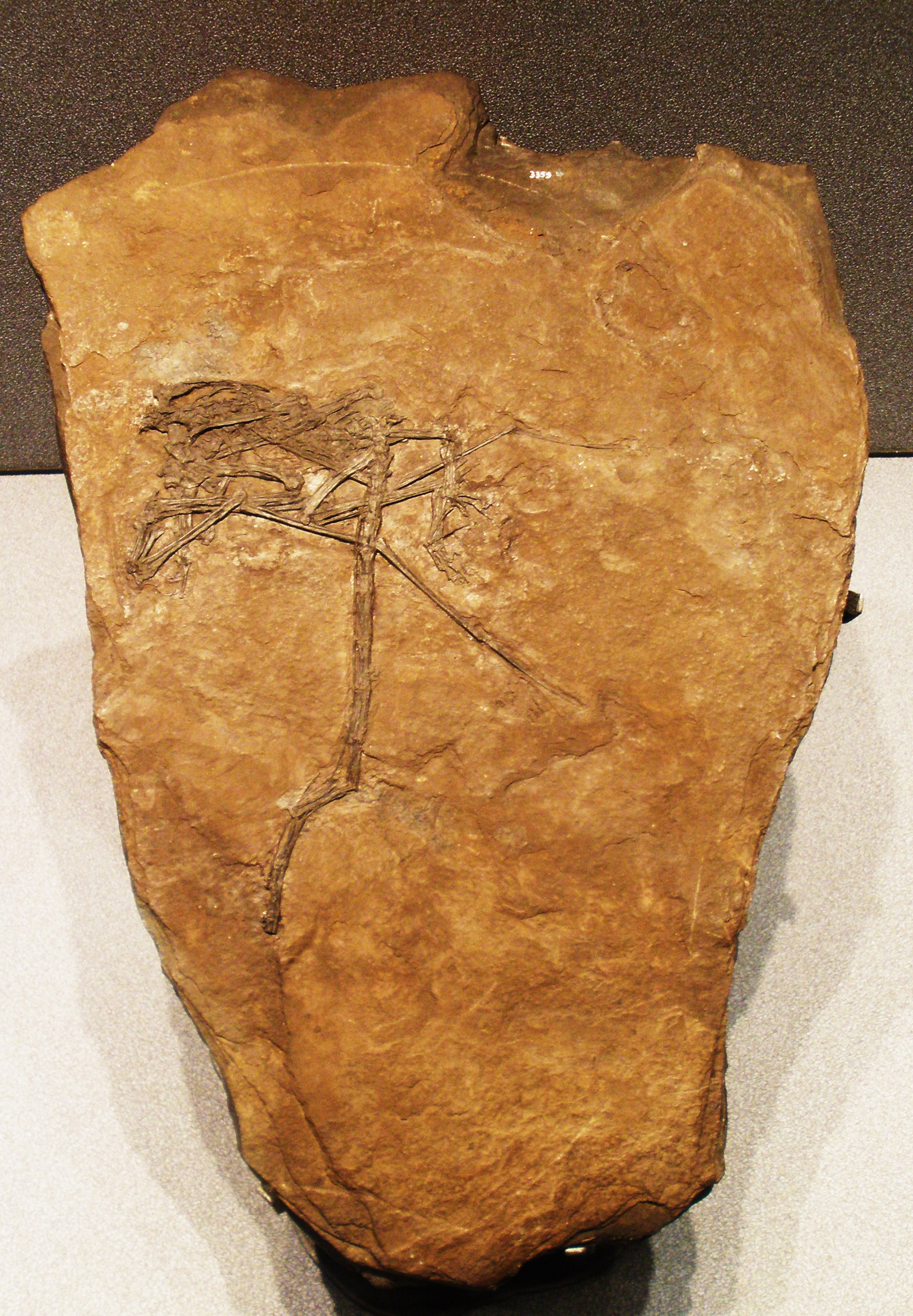
- Paratype MCSNB 3359

Scientific classification
- Kingdom: Animalia
- Phylum: Chordata
- Class: Reptilia
- Order: †Pterosauria
- Clade: †Eopterosauria
- Genus: †Peteinosaurus; Wild, 1978
- Species: †P. zambellii

Binomial name
- †Peteinosaurus zambellii Wild, 1978

= Peteinosaurus =

Peteinosaurus Temporal range: Late Triassic, 218–215 Ma

Genus of pterosaur from the Late Triassic

Peteinosaurus (/pɛˌtaɪnəˈsɔːrəs/ peh-TY-nə-SOR-əs; meaning "winged lizard") is an extinct genus of pterosaur that lived during the late Norian age of the Late Triassic, approximately 218–215 million years ago. With an estimated wingspan of about 60 cm (24 in), it was among the smallest and earliest known pterosaurs, although some estimates suggest that its wingspan may have reached 1 m (3.3 ft).

== Discovery ==
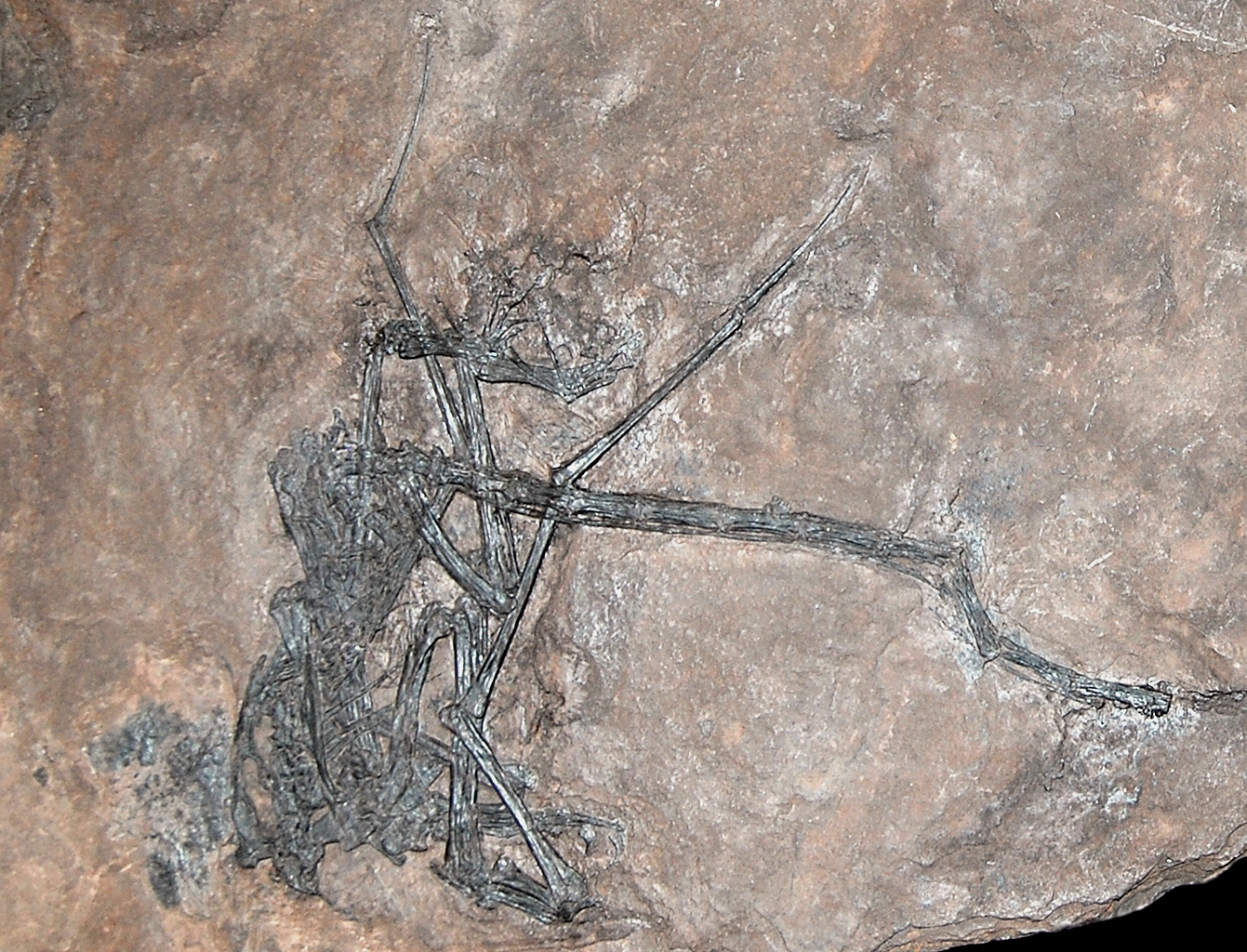
Fossil in Museo civico di scienze naturali di Bergamo

Three Peteinosaurus specimens have been discovered near Cene, Italy. The holotype (MCSNB 2886) is fragmentary and disarticulated, while the paratype (MCSNB 3359) is articulated but lacks diagnostic features confirming its assignment to the genus and may represent a different species. The paratype has a 20 cm (7.9 in) long tail stiffened by elongated vertebral extensions, a feature common among Triassic pterosaurs. The third specimen (MCSNB 3496) consists of another fragmentary skeleton. All specimens belong to subadults, and none preserves a skull.

Like other pterosaurs, Peteinosaurus had lightweight bones reinforced for flight. It possessed three types of conical teeth, and is thought to have been insectivorous. Its fifth toe was elongated and lacked a claw. The joint at is base allowed movement in a different plane from that of the other phalanges, potentially enabling it to control the cruropatagium, the membrane extending between the hind limbs, as observed in the fossil of Sordes pilosus (PIN 2585/3).

The genus has been described by the German paleontologist Rupert Wild in 1978. The type species is Peteinosaurus zambellii. The genus name is derived from Greek peteinos, "winged" and sauros, "lizard", the latter being used to indicate any saurian. The specific name, zambellii, honours Rocco Zambelli, the curator of the Bergamo natural history museum.

== Classification ==
Peteinosaurus is one of the oldest-known pterosaurs, and at a mere sixty centimetres (24 in), had a tiny wingspan when compared to some later genera, such as Pteranodon whose wingspan exceeded twenty feet. Its wings were also proportionally smaller than those of later pterosaurs, as its wing length was only twice the length of the hindlimb. All other known pterosaurs have wingspans at least three times the length of their hindlimbs. It also had single cusped teeth that lacked the specialized heterodonty present in the other Italian Triassic pterosaur genus, Eudimorphodon.

All these factors converge to hint that Peteinosaurus belongs to a group that possibly represents the most basal known pterosaurs: the Dimorphodontidae, to which it was assigned in 1988 by Robert L. Carroll. The only other known member of that group is the later genus Dimorphodon, which lent its name to the family including both genera. Later cladistic analyses however, have not shown a close connection between the two forms. Nevertheless, the possible basal position of Peteinosaurus has been affirmed by Fabio Marco Dalla Vecchia who suggested that Preondactylus, according to David Unwin the most basal pterosaur, might be a subjective junior synonym of Peteinosaurus. A 2010 cladistic analysis by Brian Andres and colleagues placed Peteinosaurus in Lonchognatha which includes Eudimorphodon and Austriadactylus as more basal. The following phylogenetic analysis follows the topology of Upchurch et al. (2015).

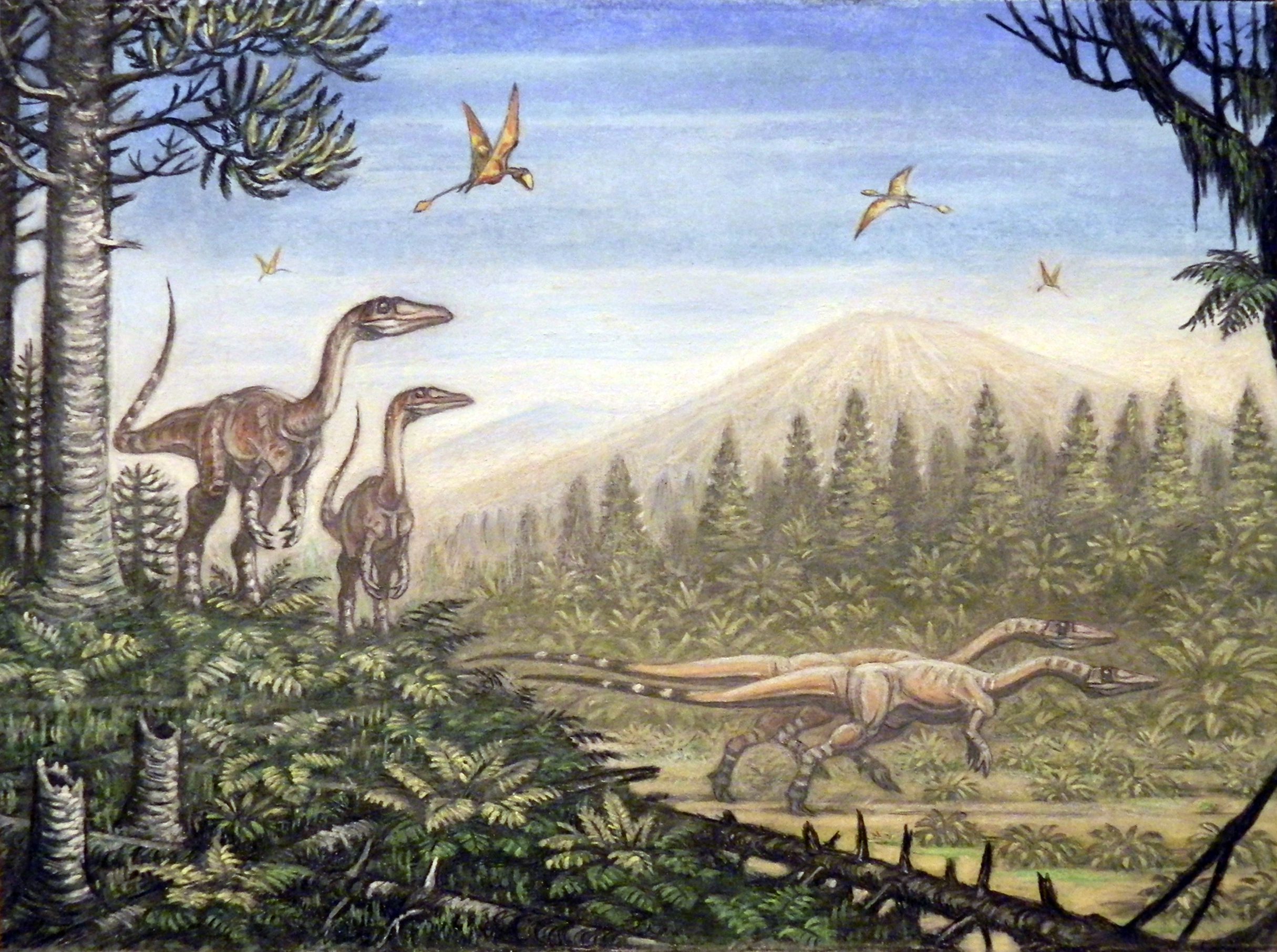
Restoration of coelophysids and Peteinosaurus in their environment

- Eopterosauria
  - - Preondactylus buffarinii
    - Austriadactylus cristatus
  - - Peteinosaurus zambellii
    - Eudimorphodontidae
      - Raeticodactylinae
        - Raeticodactylus filisurensis
        - Caviramus schesaplanensis
      - Eudimorphodontinae
        - Arcticodactylus cromptonellus
        - - Carniadactylus rosenfeldi
          - Eudimorphodon ranzii

Mark Witton, however, considers Peteinosaurus to be a true dimorphodontid. A study published in 2020 found support for a sister-taxon relationship between Peteinosaurus and Macronychoptera, which together form the clade Zambellisauria.

== See also ==
- List of pterosaur genera
- Timeline of pterosaur research
