= Pterosaur classification =

Evolutionary relationships

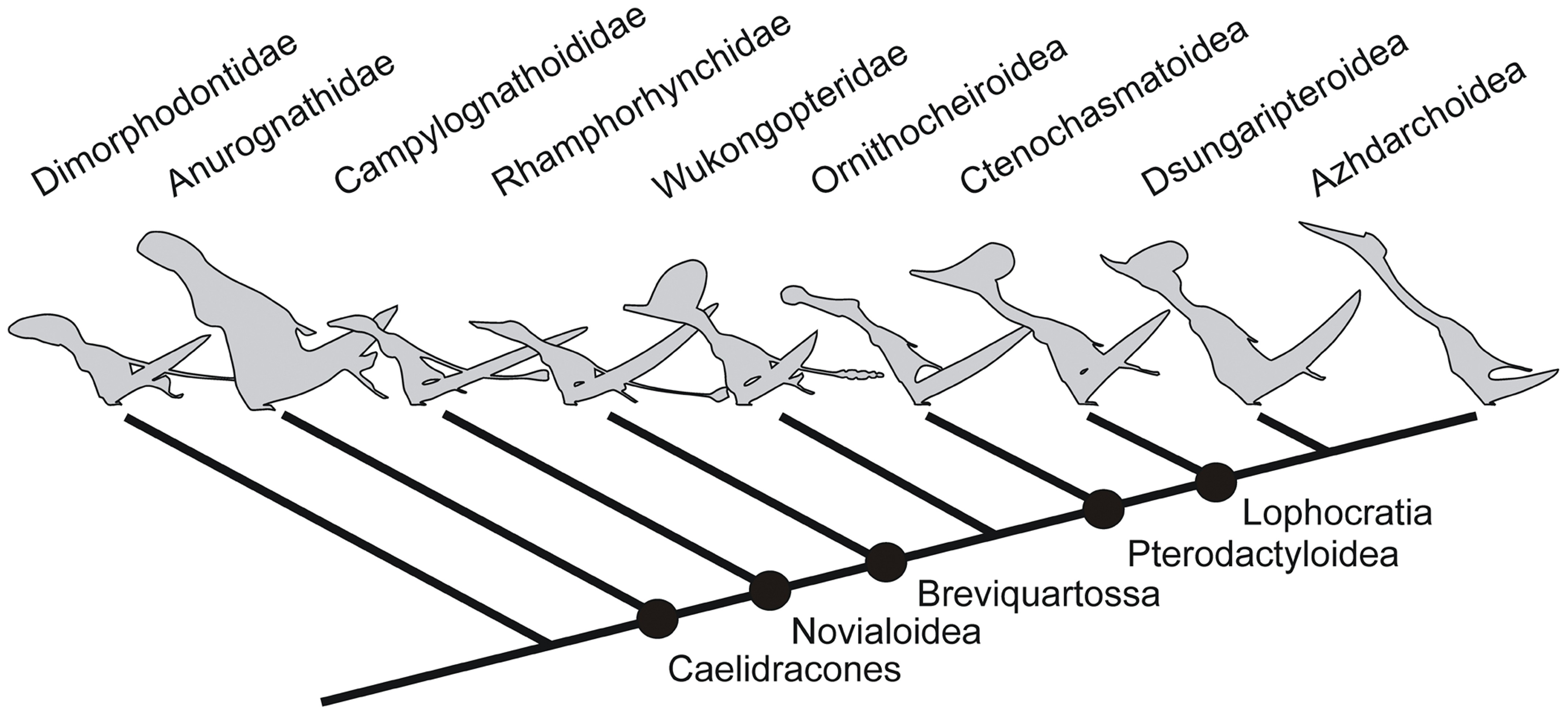
Highly simplified pterosaur phylogeny – topology based on that recovered by Unwin

This phylogeny of pterosaurs entails the various phylogenetic trees used to classify pterosaurs throughout the years and varying views of these animals. Pterosaur phylogeny is currently highly contested and several hypotheses are presented below.

== Historical classification ==
=== Early theories ===
The earliest discoveries of pterosaurs were partnered with debate over their classification and relatedness to modern animals, beginning with the 1784 description of what would become Pterodactylus as a marine vertebrate of uncertain relationships. Following this, French palaeontologist Georges Cuvier would identify the animal as a reptile; part of some previously unknown flying lineage which is now extinct. Alternative identifications for Pterodactylus around the same time included a waterfowl or a new kind of bat, and even as a form intermediate between birds and flying mammals. Very sparse pterosaur fossils were known throughout the early 19th century, and even beyond Pterodactylus the only other fossil reptiles to compare with were Protorosaurus, an ichthyosaur and a crocodile, and Mosasaurus. The first group name given for pterosaurs was in 1834 when German naturalist Johann Jakob Kaup named Pterosauri for then, which was followed by the names Podoptera, Ornithosauri, Ornithosaurii, Saurornia, Ornithosauria, and Patagiosauria introduced by various other authors. The accepted name for pterosaurs is Pterosauria, a corrected spelling introduced in 1842 by British palaeontologist Richard Owen for the name given by Kaup. Pterosaurs, while classified as an order within Reptilia by Owen, were continuously placed between mammals and reptiles, birds and mammals, or between reptiles and birds, as classification did not account for the possibility that cold-blooded reptiles could include and be ancestral to warm-blooded groups like birds, mammals, and presumably pterosaurs.

Internal subdivisions of pterosaurs were first suggested by German palaeontologist Christian Erich Hermann von Meyer in the 1840s but not formalized until 1901 when Rhamphorhynchoidea and Pterodactyloidea were named for the long- and short-tailed pterosaurs respectively. At the time of Meyer's 1846 review of pterosaurs, 16 species had been named, all within the genus Pterodactylus. Despite this, Meyer proposed separating the species of Pterodactylus into different subgenera: he placed one species in the subgenus Ornithopterus on the belief it only had two fingers, and four into the subgenus Rhamphorhynchus for possessing a beak and elongate tail, with the remaining species not placed within a subgenus. The group Diarthri was named for Pterodactylus (Ornithopterus), and Tetrarthri for Pterodactylus and Pterodactylus (Rhamphorhynchus), which itself was separated into Dentirostres for Pterodactylus and Subulirostres for Pterodactylus (Rhamphorhynchus). Similar classification schemes were used by German palaeontologist Andreas Wagner in 1851 to separate the genus Ornithocephalus (an equivalent to Pterodactylus) into "Ornithocephali brevicaudati" and "Ornithocephali longicaudati" species. Meyer maintained his classification in 1860 with the elevation of his subgenera to genus status, and the inclusion of new species named in the elapsed years. In 1870 British palaeontologist Harry Govier Seeley reviewed pterosaurs and the beliefs of previous authors on their classification. From their distinctiveness he named the new group Ornithosauria for them, at the same rank as birds, but conclusively considered them separate from birds. Seeley noted that both a family (Pterodactylæ) and subfamily (Pterodactylinæ) had been named by French naturalist Charles Lucien Bonaparte for Pterodactylus and short-tailed pterosaurs, and that following this precedent the families Rhamphorhynchæ, Dimorphodontæ, and Ornithocheiræ could be named for the existing genera of long-tailed pterosaurs Rhamphorhynchus, Dimorphodon, and Ornithocheirus. This was also followed by the introduction of the suborder Pteranodontia and family Pteranodontidae by American palaeontologist Othniel Charles Marsh in 1876 following the recognition that some species of Pterodactylus were toothless could be moved to their own genus Pteranodon. All these families remain in use in pterosaur systematics, but with modified spellings to reflect their rank.

=== Early phylogenetics ===
The phylogenetics of pterosaurs remained relatively understudied to assess the accuracy of traditional classifications as exemplified by the 1978 study of Wellnhofer, with only preliminary studies published until the 2000s. The first phylogenetic study was that of Howse in 1986 which only included characters of the cervical vertebrae and was restricted to some pterodactyloids. This was followed by a few iterations of a phylogenetic analysis by Bennett on pterodactyloids which recovered consistent results despite problems with missing data. Reanalysis of these earlier studies by Brazilian palaeontologist Alexander Kellner failed to recover the results that were presented in these studies. The analysis of British palaeontologist David Unwin in 1991 was the first to include a broad array of both pterodactyloid and rhamphorhynchoid pterosaurs, and found that as suspected previously, "rhamphorhynchoids" were an unnatural group that evolved into pterodactyloids. Three pterodactyloid groups, Dsungaripteroidea, Ornithocheiroidea and Azhdarchoidea, were found, with the unique feature of this study being the placement of Pterodactylus and Ctenochasma as azhdarchoids. Unwin and Kellner published additional and revised classifications of pterosaurs throughout the 1990s, with the greatest difference between the two being the relationships of the basalmost pterosaurs. Additional divergent relationships were presented in the late 1990s during conferences that suggested the unity of all toothless pterosaurs within one group, or other unspecified differences, but these results have not been published. Simultaneously in 2003 as part of a Special Publication of the Geological Society of London on the evolution and palaeobiology of pterosaurs, both Kellner and Unwin published updated comprehensive pterosaur phylogenies. They are both shown below, simplified to display broader clade relationships.

Pterosaur relationships after Kellner (2003)

- Pterosauria
  - - Anurognathidae
      - Anurognathus
      - Asiaticognathidae
  - - Sordes
    - - Scaphognathus
      - Preondactylus
      - - Dorygnathus
        - - Dimorphodon
          - - Peteinosaurus
            - Carniadactylus
          - - Campylognathoididae
            - - Rhamphorhynchidae
              - - - Archaeopterodactyloidea
                    - - Pterodactylus
                      - Germanodactylus
                    - - Ctenochasmatidae
                      - Gallodactylidae
                - - Nyctosauridae
                  - - - Pteranodontoidea
                        - Pteranodon
                        - - Istiodactylus
                          - - Ornithocheirus
                            - Anhangueridae
                    - - Dsungaripteridae
                      - - Tapejaridae
                        - Azhdarchidae

Pterosaur relationships after Unwin (2003)

- Pterosauria
  - Preondactylus
  - - Dimorphodontidae
    - - Anurognathidae
      - - Campylognathoididae
        - - - Rhamphorhynchidae
              - Scaphognathinae
              - Rhamphorhynchinae
          - - - Ornithocheiroidea
                - Istiodactylus
                - - Ornithocheiridae
                  - - Pteranodontidae
                    - Nyctosaurus
            - - Ctenochasmatoidea
                - Cycnorhamphus
                - - Pterodactylus
                  - Lonchodectidae
                  - Ctenochasmatidae
              - Dsungaripteroidea
                - Germanodactylus
                - Dsungaripteridae
              - Azhdarchoidea
                - Tapejara
                - - Tupuxuara
                  - Azhdarchidae

In reviewing the book, Russian palaeontologist Alexander Averianov noted that "Asiaticognathidae" named by Kellner was invalid, and that Unwin's group Lonchodectidae was a nomen nudum when first mentioned but was validly named later. He believed that Unwin's topology was less radical and better substantiated, recovering the Triassic taxon Preondactylus as the earliest pterosaur rather than anurognathids. Kellner discussed some of the differences between the results of himself and Unwin the subsequent year, with a focus on the recovery of Tapejaridae but also some of the methodological differences. While Kellner used individual species in his analysis, Unwin scored composites to achieve greater completeness, which had the negative effect of assuming the validity of the composite taxa he scored, some of which are controversial (Dimorphodontidae, Scaphognathidae and Ornithocheiridae as examples). This also introduced the possibility of miscoring, such as presenting a notarium as absent in ornithocheirids despite most either lacking preservation of the region or being juveniles that would lack it. Following this, the 2006 study of British palaeontologists David Martill and Darren Naish focused on the disagreements between Unwin and Kellner on the relationships of Tapejaridae and Neoazhdarchia. They followed the definition of Unwin for Azhdarchoidea as he was the original author of the group, and also found that Tupuxuara was not a tapejarid and instead Neoazhdarchia (for Tupuxuara and azhdarchids to the exclusion of Tapejara) was a valid clade. Both the phylogenetic studies of Kellner and Unwin were criticized by American palaeontologist Christopher Bennett for the amount of new clades they name despite the lack of clear understanding of pterosaur relationships.

Studies subsequent to 2003 have primarily modified upon either the Kellner- or Unwin-based analyses, with the introductions of novel characters and new taxa, but composite and independent studies also now exist. One such independent study is that of Italian palaeontologist Fabio Marco Dalla Vecchia who, using the Unwin analysis with modifications, recovered substantially different relationships for early and Triassic pterosaurs. Austriadactylus was removed from Campylognathoididae where it had been found by Unwin and was instead basalmost pterosaur alongside Preondactylus, while Eudimorphodon and numerous other Triassic pterosaurs were members of the family. Another independent study is that of American palaeontologist Brian Andres and colleagues in 2010, compiled from all previous analyses of early pterosaurs. Notable differences from both Kellner and Unwin topologies were found, but also general similarities. Preondactylus was the most basal pterosaur like in Unwin analyses, the relationships within Anurognathidae were in agreement with Kellner analyses, and the relative order of the genera Dimorphodon, Campylognathoides and Rhamphorhynchus were consistent between all three. The Andres analysis showed greater agreement with the ages of taxa than either previous study, both through the placement of anurognathids as sister to pterodactyloids but also in finding the families Dimorphodontidae and Campylognathoididae to be unsupported. Eudimorphodon was found to be a basal pterosaur, distant from Campylognathoides and significantly reducing the Triassic presence of taxa around pterodactyloids. The placement of anurognathids was also even closer to pterodactyloids than found in any previous study in part due to the reinterpretation of their skulls to have a nasoantorbital fenestra as in pterodactyloids. Both the 2009 Dalla Vecchia and 2010 Andres and colleagues results are shown below.

Basal pterosaur relationships after Dalla Vecchia (2009)

- Pterosauria
  - - Preondactylus
    - Austriadactylus
  - - - Austriadraco
      - Arcticodactylus
    - - MCSNB 3359
      - Peteinosaurus
      - - Dimorphodon
        - - - Campylognathoididae
              - Campylognathoides
              - - Eudimorphodon
                - - MSCNB 8950
                  - - Carniadactylus
                    - - Caviramus
                      - Raeticodactylus
          - - Dorygnathus
            - - - Sordes
                - Scaphognathus
              - - Rhamphorhynchus
                - - Anurognathidae
                  - Pterodactyloidea

Basal pterosaur relationships after Andres et al. (2010)

- Pterosauria
  - Preondactylus
  - - - Austriadactylus
      - Eudimorphodon
    - - Peteinosaurus
      - - Dimorphodon
        - - Campylognathoides
          - - - Rhamphorhynchidae
                - Scaphognathus
                - - Dorygnathus
                  - - - Cacibupteryx
                      - Rhamphorhynchus
                    - - Harpactognathus
                      - - Angustinaripterus
                        - Sericipterus
            - - Sordes
              - - Anurognathidae
                - Pterodactyloidea

== Modern classification ==
The most comprehensive analyses of total pterosaur relationships were generated by the work of Brazilian palaeontologist Rubi Pêgas, who drew from works across all of pterosaur groups from Howse in 1986 to Andres in 2021. 185 different pterosaurs were included when first published in 2024, and expansions in 2025 in both azhdarchids and ornithocheiriforms. The nomenclature of pterosaur clades used follows the extensive definitions provided by Andres in 2021 with modifications in certain groups and additions in others. The nomenclature of pterosaurs can be convoluted and contradictory in areas because of the different relationships recovered, though studies are aimed at making the use of clades consistent. The study of Andres in 2021 was previously the most comprehensive, and also redefined every clade of pterosaurs that existed at the time, so it is shown below to illustrate the groups as defined.

- Pterosauria
  - - Eopterosauria
      - Preondactylia
      - - Peteinosaurus
        - - Eudimorphodontidae
          - Raeticodactylidae
  - - Dimorphodontia
    - - Herbstosaurus
      - - Campylognathoides
        - - - Rhamphorhynchidae
              - Scaphognathus
              - - - Dorygnathus
                  - - Klobiodon
                    - Dolicorhamphus
                - - Fenghuangopterus
                  - - Angustinaripterini
                    - Rhamphorhynchini
          - - Sordes
            - - - Darwinoptera
                  - Pterorhynchus
                  - - Kunpengopterus
                    - Wukongopterinae
              - - Changchengopterus
                - - - Anurognathidae
                      - Dendrorhynchoides
                      - - Batrachognathinae
                        - - Anurognathus
                          - Jeholopterus
                  - - Kryptodrakon
                    - - Propterodactylus
                      - - - Archaeopterodactyloidea
                            - - Cuspicephalus
                              - Germanodactylus
                            - - Pterodactylus
                              - - - Normannognathus
                                  - Aurorazhdarcho
                                  - Cycnorhamphus
                                - - - Ctenochasmatinae
                                      - Pterodactylus micronyx
                                      - - Pterodaustrini
                                        - - Ctenochasma
                                          - Liaodactylus
                                  - - Kepodactylus
                                    - - Elanodactylus
                                      - - Moganopterinae
                                        - - Ardeadactylus
                                          - Gnathosaurinae
                        - - Haopterus
                          - - - Pteranodontoidea
                                - - Pteranodontia
                                    - - Pteranodon
                                      - Ornithostoma
                                      - Volgadraco
                                      - Tethydraco
                                    - - Alamodactylus
                                      - - Cretornis
                                        - - Nyctosauridae
                                          - - Alcione elainus
                                            - Simurghia
                                - - - Serradraco
                                    - Aussiedraco
                                  - - - Hongshanopterus
                                      - - Targaryendraco
                                        - Lonchodectes
                                    - - - Ikrandraco
                                        - Lonchodraco
                                      - - - Istiodactylidae
                                            - Nurhachius
                                            - Istiodactylinae
                                        - - - Pterodactylus polyodon
                                            - Boreopteridae
                                          - - Hamipterus
                                            - - - Brasileodactylus
                                                - Barbosania
                                                - Cearadactylus
                                              - - - Ludodactylus
                                                  - - Guidraco
                                                    - - Cimoliopterus
                                                      - - Camposipterus
                                                        - Aetodactylus
                                                - - Anhangueridae
                                                  - - Tropeognathus
                                                    - Ornithocheirinae
                            - - - Tapejaridae
                                  - Sinopterinae
                                  - - Tapejarini
                                    - - Lacusovagus
                                      - - Bakonydraco
                                        - Keresdrakon
                              - - - Dsungaripteromorpha
                                    - Microtuban
                                    - - - Thalassodromidae
                                          - Tupuxuara
                                          - Thalassodrominae
                                      - - Noripterinae
                                        - Dsungaripterinae
                                - - - Chaoyangopteridae
                                      - Eoazhdarcho
                                      - - Shenzhoupterus
                                        - Chaoyangopterinae
                                  - - Radiodactylus
                                    - - Montanazhdarcho
                                      - - Azhdarchinae
                                        - Quetzalcoatlinae
