= "Dimorphodon" weintraubi =

"Dimorphodon" weintraubi Temporal range: Early Jurassic, 189–185 Ma
- Fossil specimen

Scientific classification
- Kingdom: Animalia
- Phylum: Chordata
- Class: Reptilia
- Order: †Pterosauria
- Family: †Dimorphodontidae
- Genus: †Dimorphodon
- Species: †D. weintraubi

Binomial name
- †Dimorphodon weintraubi Clark et al., 1998

Species of pterosaur

"Dimorphodon" weintraubi is an extinct species of pterosaur originally thought to be a species of the primitive pterosaur genus Dimorphodon from the Lower Jurassic La Boca Formation of Mexico. It was named by James Clark and others in 1998, in honour of Dr. Robert L. Weintraub. Phylogenetic analyses have found "Dimorphodon" weintraubi as the earliest-diverging anurognathid, extending the origin of this clade to the Early Jurassic.

== Description ==
The holotype specimen, IGM 3494, is an uncrushed partial skeleton, comprising the posterior part of the skull, four cervical vertebrae, scapulocoracoids from both sides, the left humerus, the right leg, and most of the right arm of the animal. According to the authors of its description, the specimen came from an animal bigger than the largest Dimorphodon specimens.

== Locomotion ==
The completeness of the right foot, as well as the fact that the specimen was uncrushed, helped Clark and others to deduce that the animal was a plantigrade, instead of the bird-like digitigrade feet, because for the animal to walk in a digitigrade position, it would have to separate the joints in its feet. This helped to "revive" the idea that pterosaurs were quadrupedal when on the ground, at least in primitive pterosaurs. Clark et al. also found that the foot of the animal was capable of grasping, and they suggested that basal pterosaurs would have been scansorial, and maybe arboreal as well.

== Classification ==
"Dimorphodon" weintraubi was originally described as a species of Dimorphodon, until the 2019 description of Seazzadactylus by Vecchia that placed the animal as the most basal anurognathid. The 2021 description of Sinomacrops by Wei and others also supported this idea, discussing it more in depth and emphasizing the need for a redescription of the fossil material. Below is a simplified cladogram made from a phylogenetic analysis performed by Wei et al.

- Anurognathidae
  - "Dimorphodon" weintraubi
  - - Batrachognathinae
      - Sinomacrops bondei
      - Batrachognathus volans
    - Anurognathinae
      - Dendrorhynchoides curvidentatus
      - - Luopterus mutoudengensis
        - - Jeholopterus ningchengensis
          - - Anurognathus ammoni
            - Vesperopterylus lamadongensis
