= Dendrorhynchus =

Scientific classification
- Domain: Eukaryota
- (unranked): SAR
- (unranked): Alveolata
- Phylum: Apicomplexa
- Class: Conoidasida
- Order: Eugregarinorida
- Family: Dactylophoridae
- Genus: Dendrorhynchus

Type species
- Dendrorhynchus systeni Keilin, 1920

Species
- Dendrorhynchus systeni; Dendrorhynchus keilini

Genus of single-celled organisms

Dendrorhynchus is a gregarine genus with total 2 species. The genus was first described in 1920 by David Keilin from the alimentary canal of dolichopodid larvae Systenus.

== Homonyms ==
Dendrorhynchus is a senior homonym for genera of nemerteans (replaced with Polydendrorhynchus) and pterosaurs (replaced with Dendrorhynchoides).
