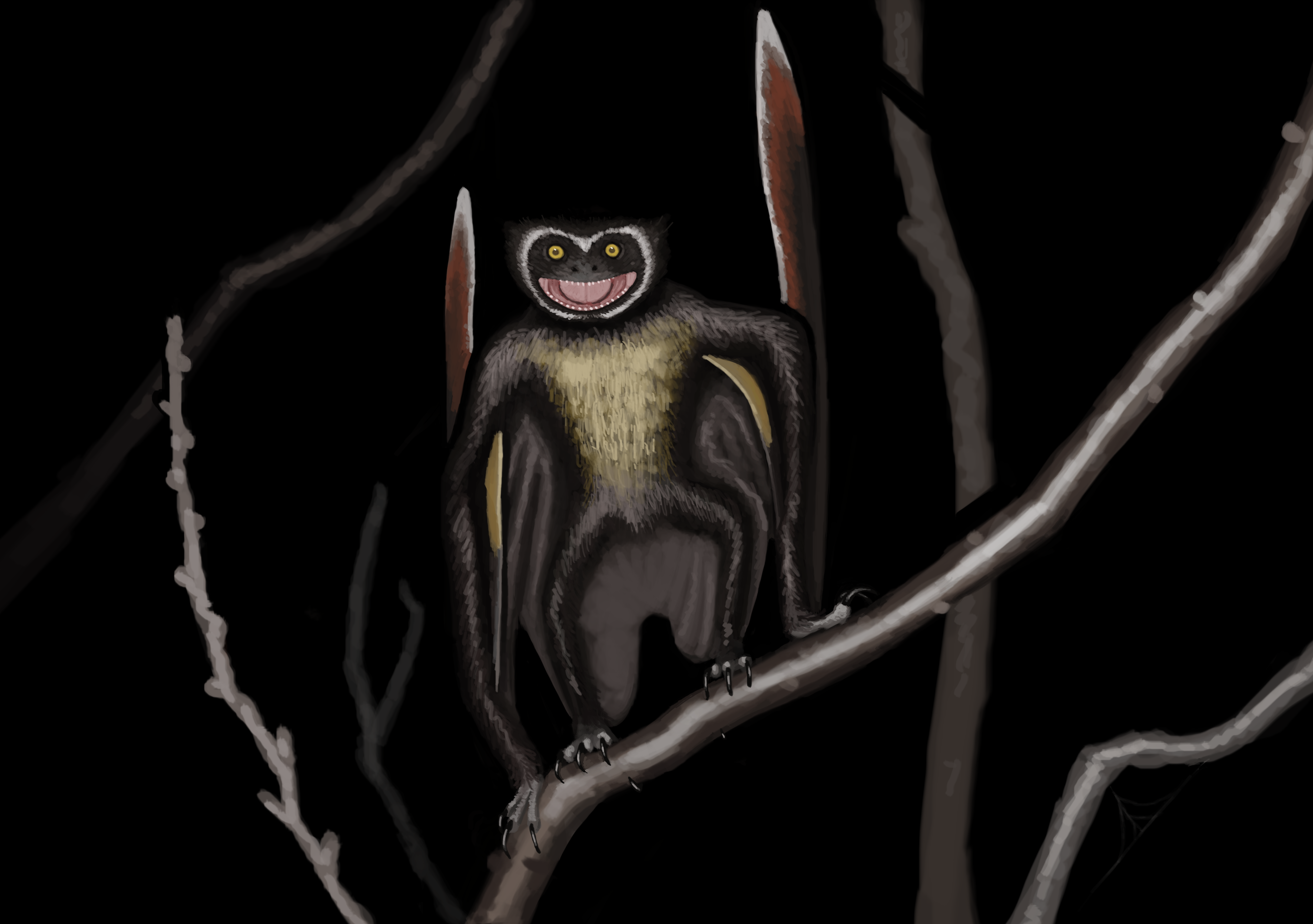
- Life reconstruction of Vesperopterylus on a tree branch

Scientific classification
- Kingdom: Animalia
- Phylum: Chordata
- Class: Reptilia
- Order: †Pterosauria
- Family: †Anurognathidae
- Subfamily: †Anurognathinae
- Genus: †Vesperopterylus; Lü et al., 2017

Type species
- †Vesperopterylus lamadongensis Lü et al., 2017

= Vesperopterylus =

Vesperopterylus Temporal range: Aptian, 122.1 Ma

Genus of anurognathid pterosaur from the Early Cretaceous

Vesperopterylus (meaning "dusk wing") is a genus of anurognathid pterosaur from the Early Cretaceous Jiufotang Formation of China, the geologically youngest member of its group. Notably, Vesperopterylus appears to have a reversed first toe, which would have been suited for gripping; it was likely arboreal, climbing or clinging to tree branches with curved, sharp claws. It also has a relatively short tail, in contrast with its tailless (Jeholopterus) and long-tailed (Dendrorhynchoides) relatives. It was first described and named by Lü Junchang et al. While the original spelling of the name was Versperopterylus, this was a typo, and was emended by the authors in accordance with the International Code of Zoological Nomenclature.

== Classification ==
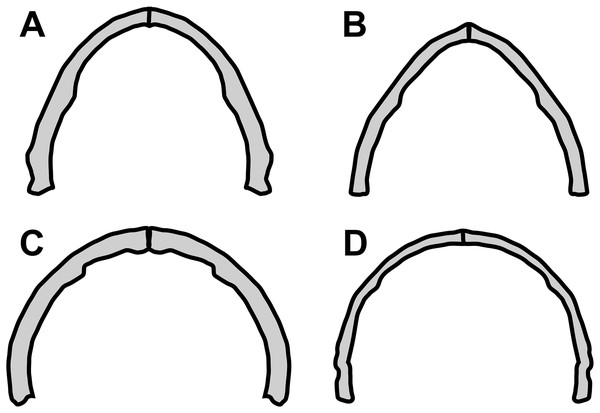
Variation in anurognathid jaw shape, notice Vesperopterylus (D)

In 2021, a phylogenetic analysis conducted by Xuefang Wei and colleagues recovered Vesperopterylus within the subfamily Anurognathinae, a subfamily within the family Anurognathidae. Within the subfamily, Vesperopterylus was recovered in a derived position, sister taxon to Anurognathus. Below is a cladogram representing their phylogenetic analysis:

- Anurognathidae
  - "Dimorphodon" weintraubi
  - - Batrachognathinae
      - Sinomacrops bondei
      - Batrachognathus volans
    - Anurognathinae
      - Dendrorhynchoides curvidentatus
      - - Luopterus mutoudengensis
        - - Jeholopterus ningchengensis
          - - Anurognathus ammoni
            - Vesperopterylus lamadongensis
