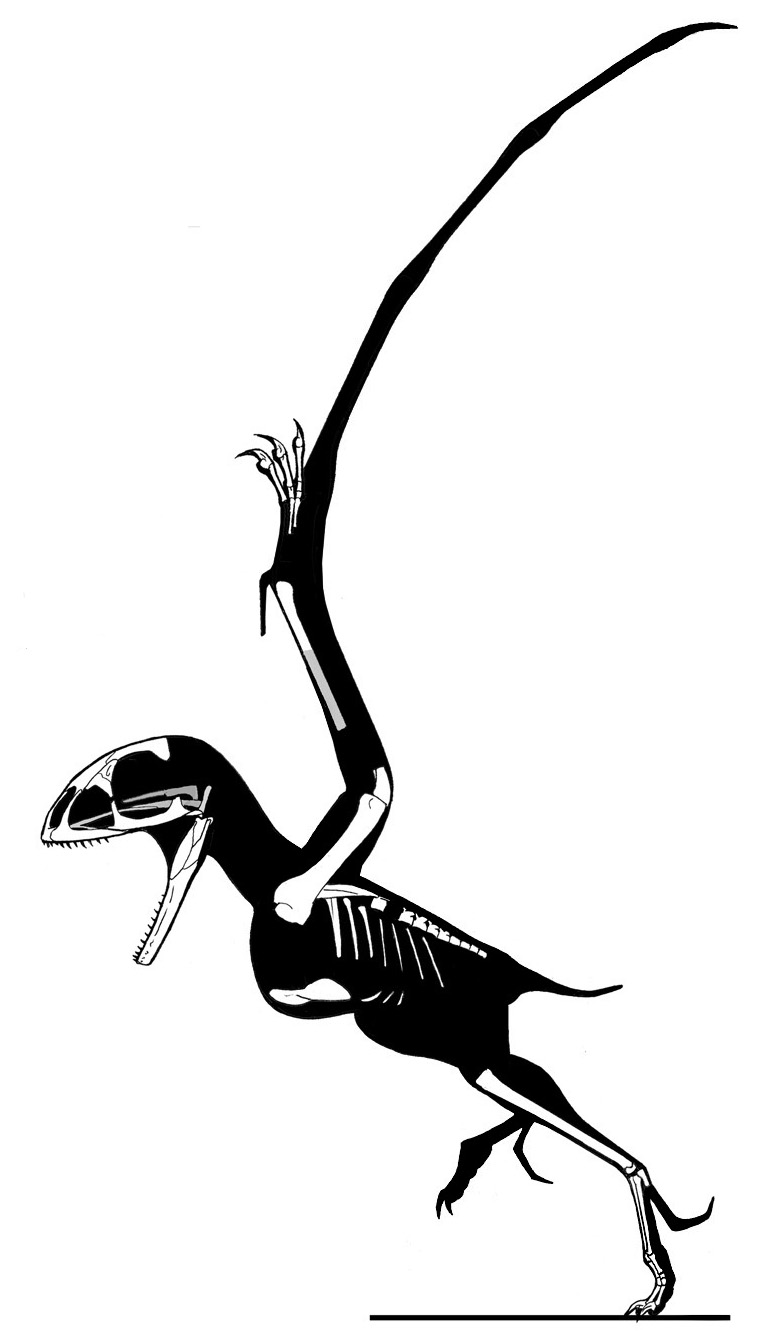
- Skeletal restoration of the holotype by Jaime Headden

Scientific classification
- Kingdom: Animalia
- Phylum: Chordata
- Class: Reptilia
- Order: †Pterosauria
- Family: †Anurognathidae
- Genus: †Batrachognathus; Ryabinin, 1948
- Species: †B. volans

Binomial name
- †Batrachognathus volans Ryabinin, 1948

= Batrachognathus =

Batrachognathus Temporal range: Late Jurassic, Oxfordian–Kimmeridgian

Genus of anurognathid pterosaur

Batrachognathus is an extinct genus of anurognathid pterosaur from the Late Jurassic (Oxfordian to Kimmeridgian) Karabastau Formation of the central Asian republic of Kazakhstan. The genus was named in 1948 by the Russian paleontologist Anatoly Nicolaevich Ryabinin. The type species is Batrachognathus volans. The genus name is derived from Greek batrakhos, "frog" and gnathos, "jaw", in reference to the short wide head. The specific epithet means "flying" in Latin.

== Description ==
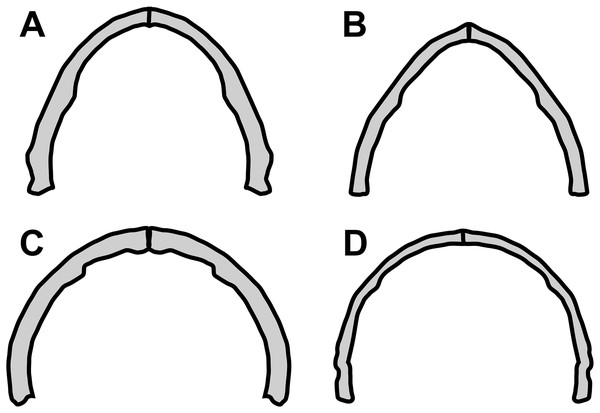
Variation in anurognathid jaw shape, notice Batrachognathus (A)

Batrachognathus was a small pterosaur, with a wingspan of 50–75 cm (1 ft 8 in – 2 ft 6 in) and body mass of 40 g (1.4 oz), although the known specimens may not be adults. Like all anurognathids Batrachognathus is assumed to have been an insectivore, catching insects and perhaps small fish on the wing with its broad mouth.

Three fossils have been found in a lacustrine sediment in the North-West Tien Shan foothills of the Karatau Mountains. In the Jurassic this area had some similarities in habitat to the Solnhofen lagoon deposits in Bavaria, Germany. The genus is based on holotype PIN 52-2, an incomplete and disarticulated skeleton consisting of skull fragments, jaws, vertebrae, ribs, legs and wing bones. The skull of 48 mm (1.9 in) long is high, short and broad. The upper jaws have in total 22 or 24 recurved conical teeth; with the lower jaws they make a short and very wide mouth. The orbit and antorbital fenestra of the skull are combined into a single opening, an orbitoantorbital fenestra, similar to the nasoantorbital fenestra of monofenestratan pterosaurs. Although the holotype does not preserve the tail, an undescribed specimen preserves a comparatively long tail for an anurognathid, similar to the closely related Sinomacrops.

== Classification ==
Batrachognathus was assigned to the Anurognathidae, as a relative of Anurognathus. In 2003 Alexander Kellner named the clade Asiaticognathidae to include it and the Asian Anurognathid Dendrorhynchoides. Christopher Bennett pointed out the name Asiaticognathidae was inappropriate, as the clade lacked an Asiaticognathus, and in 2009 Kellner proposed Batrachognathinae as a replacement. According to an analysis in 2006 by Lü Junchang, Batrachognathus and Jeholopterus are sister taxa. In 2021, a phylogenetic analysis conducted by Xuefang Wei and colleagues recovered Batrachognathus within the subfamily Batrachognathinae, sister taxon to the genus Sinomacrops. Below is a cladogram representing their phylogenetic analysis:

- Anurognathidae
  - "Dimorphodon" weintraubi
  - - Batrachognathinae
      - Sinomacrops bondei
      - Batrachognathus volans
    - Anurognathinae
      - Dendrorhynchoides curvidentatus
      - - Luopterus mutoudengensis
        - - Jeholopterus ningchengensis
          - - Anurognathus ammoni
            - Vesperopterylus lamadongensis

== See also ==
- List of pterosaur genera
- Timeline of pterosaur research
