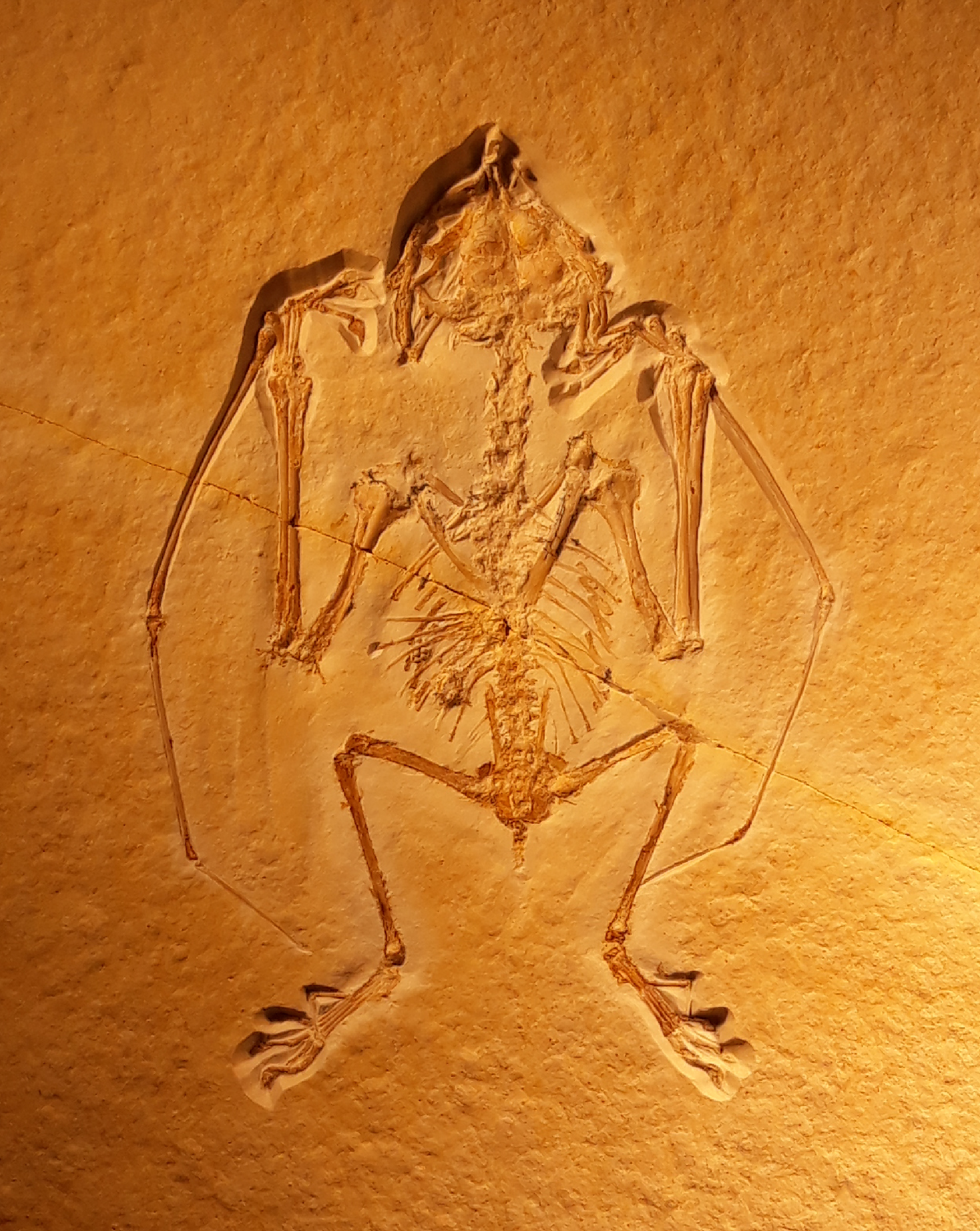
- Juvenile fossil, Dinosaurier Museum Altmühltal

Scientific classification
- Kingdom: Animalia
- Phylum: Chordata
- Class: Reptilia
- Order: †Pterosauria
- Family: †Anurognathidae
- Subfamily: †Anurognathinae; Nopcsa, 1928
- Genus: †Anurognathus; Döderlein, 1923
- Species: †A. ammoni

Binomial name
- †Anurognathus ammoni Döderlein, 1923

= Anurognathus =

Anurognathus Temporal range: Late Jurassic, 150.8–148.5 Ma

Genus of anurognathid pterosaur from the Late Jurassic

Anurognathus (from the Greek ανоυρα γναθος "frog jaw") is an extinct genus of small pterosaur from the Late Jurassic Altmühltal Formation of Germany. Anurognathus was first named and described by Ludwig Döderlein in 1923. The type species is Anurognathus ammoni. The specific name ammoni honours the Bavarian geologist Ludwig von Ammon, from whose collection Döderlein had acquired the fossil in 1922.

== Discovery ==
The genus is based on holotype BSP 1922.I.42 (Bayerische Staatssammlung für Palaeontologie und Geologie), found in the Solnhofen limestone near Eichstätt no later than 1922. It consists of a crushed, relatively complete skeleton on a slab. The counterslab is missing and with it most of the bones: much of the skeleton is only visible as an impression.

== Description ==
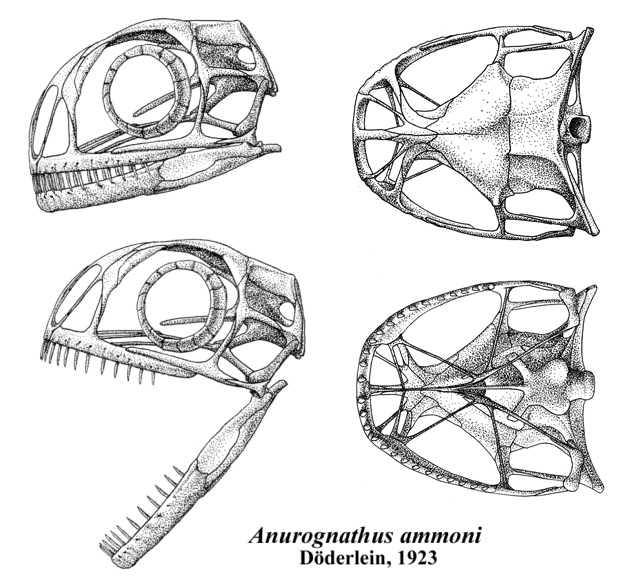
Restored skull

Anurognathus had a short head with pin-like teeth for catching insects. Although it traditionally is ascribed to the long-tailed pterosaur group "Rhamphorhynchoidea", its tail was comparatively short, allowing it more maneuverability for hunting. According to Döderlein, the reduced tail of Anurognathus was similar to the pygostyle of modern birds. Its more typical "rhamphorhynchoid" characters include an elongated fifth toe and short metacarpals and neck.In 2008, Mark P. Witton estimated a mass of 40 g (1.4 oz) for a specimen with a 35 cm (14 in) wingspan. The holotype was redescribed by Peter Wellnhofer in 1975.

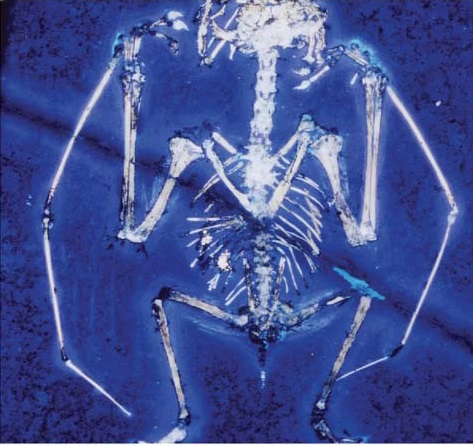
An Anurognathus specimen under UV lighting revealing soft tissue details

Later a second, smaller specimen was found, probably of a subadult individual. Its slab and counterslab are separated and both were sold to private collections; neither has an official registration. It was described by S. Christopher Bennett in 2007. This second exemplar is much more complete and better articulated. It shows impressions of a large part of the flight membrane and under UV-light remains of the muscles of the thigh and arm become visible. It provided new information on many points of the anatomy. The skull was shown to have been very short and broad, wider than long. It transpired that Wellnhofer had incorrectly reconstructed the skull in 1975, mistaking the large eye sockets for the fenestrae antorbitales, skull openings that in most pterosaurs are larger than the orbits but in Anurognathus they are small and together with the nostrils are placed at the front of the flat snout. The proportionally enormous orbits of Anurognathus most likely supported very large eyes, which may have given Anurognathus high visual acuity in dim light conditions, its eyes also pointed forward to a degree, providing some binocular vision. Most of the skull consisted of bone struts. The presumed pygostyle was absent; investigating the real nine tail vertebrae instead of impressions showed that they were unfused, though very reduced. The wing finger lacked the fourth phalanx. According to Bennett a membrane, visible near the shin, showed that the wing contacted the ankle and was thus rather short and broad. Bennett also restudied the holotype, interpreting bumps on the jaws as an indication that hairs forming a protruding bristle were present on the snout.

== Classification ==
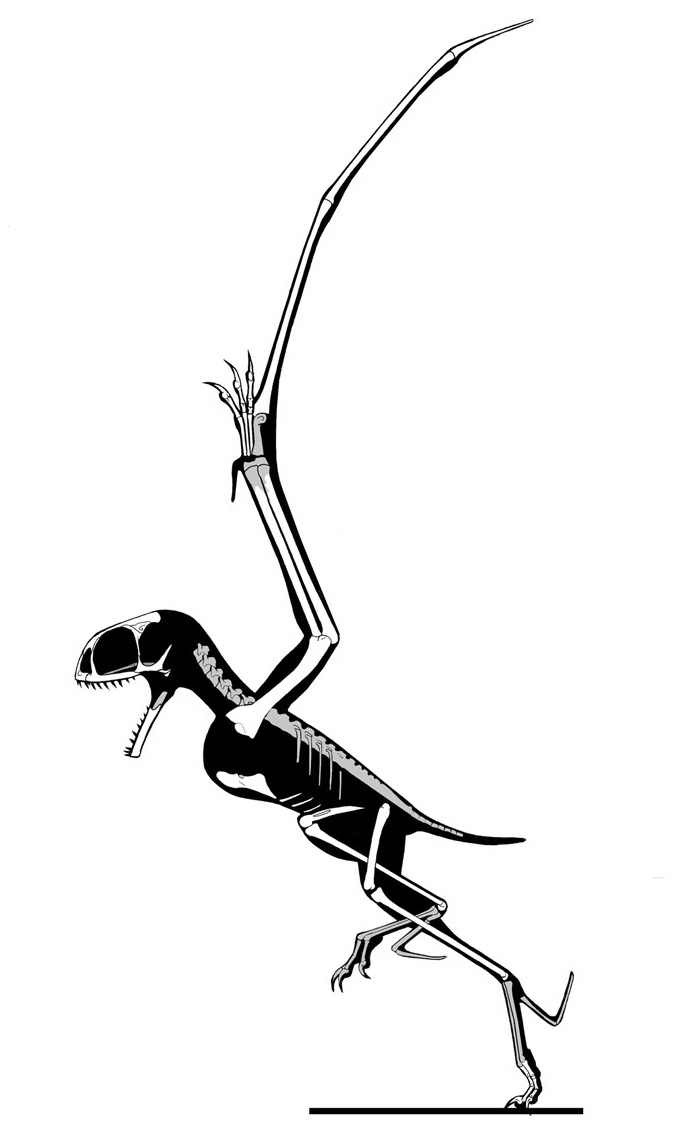
Diagram of the holotype specimen

Anurognathus was assigned by Oskar Kuhn to the family Anurognathidae in 1937. In the modern clade Anurognathidae, Anurognathus is the sister taxon of the clade Batrachognathinae, which contains the species Batrachognathus, Dendrorhynchoides and Jeholopterus. In 2021, a phylogenetic analysis conducted by Xuefang Wei and colleagues recovered Anurognathus within the subfamily Anurognathinae, a subfamily within the family Anurognathidae. Anurognathus was found to have been the sister taxon to Vesperopterylus in the study. Below is a cladogram representing their phylogenetic analysis:

- Anurognathidae
  - "Dimorphodon" weintraubi
  - - Batrachognathinae
      - Sinomacrops bondei
      - Batrachognathus volans
    - Anurognathinae
      - Dendrorhynchoides curvidentatus
      - - Luopterus mutoudengensis
        - - Jeholopterus ningchengensis
          - - Anurognathus ammoni
            - Vesperopterylus lamadongensis

== Paleobiology ==
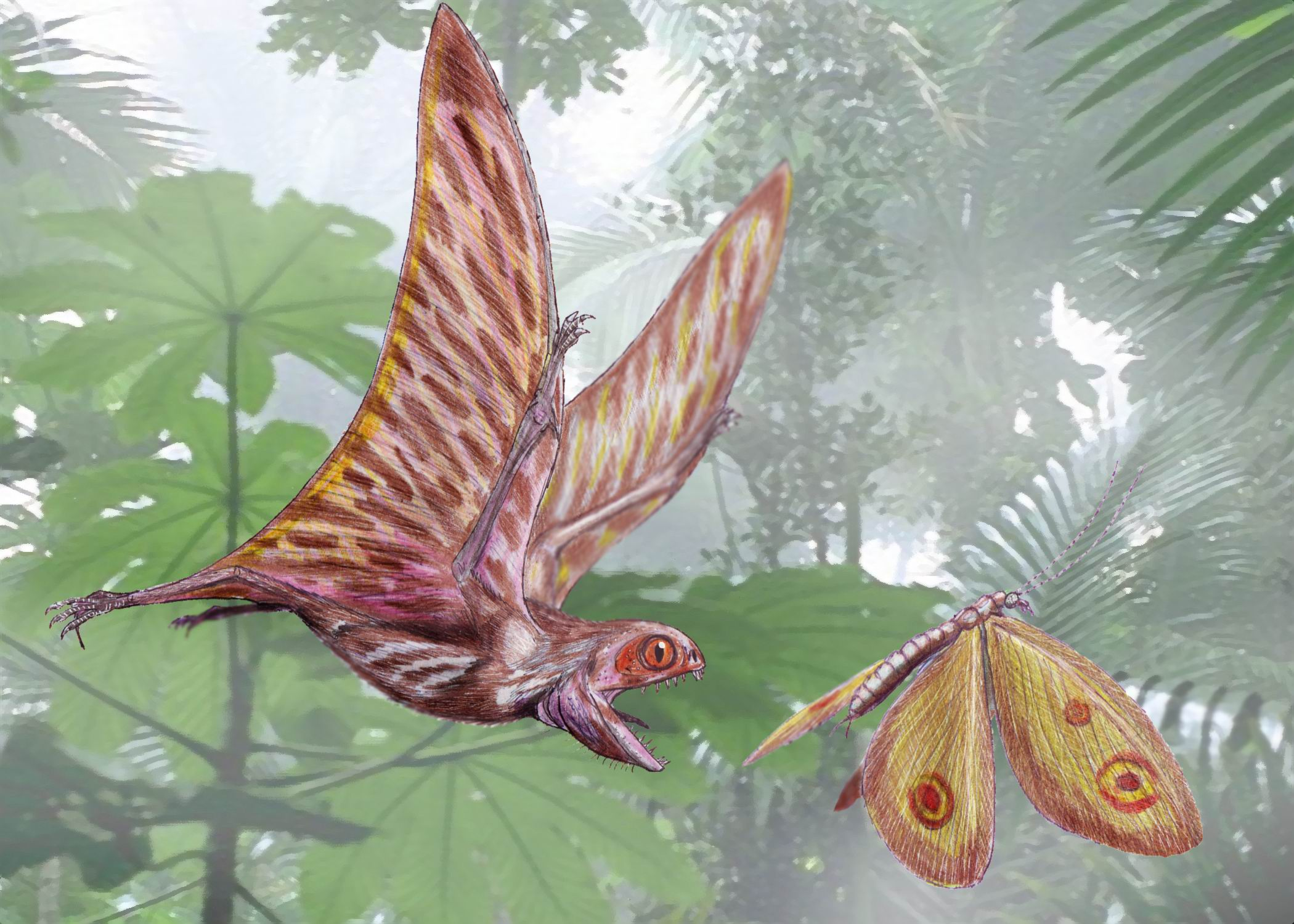
Illustrated hunting a lacewing Kalligramma haeckeli

According to Döderlein Anurognathus was, with its long wings, a swift flyer, surprising its prey, similar to the modern nightjar. Bennett, however, infers from the discovery of the true shorter size of the wings, combined with the short tail, that it was a slower flying predator, specialised in hunting by maneuverability, its large eyes adapted to a crepuscular way of life. This would also be supported by a very large flexibility of the wing finger joints.

Researcher Chris Bennett published a paper in 1995 that looked into the growth rates of pterosaurs. With the fossils found of Rhamphorhynchus, he was able to see that all bones that were preserved on few-day-old species were very hard from ossifications just as would be seen with adults. This developmental stage was rapidly progressing compared to that of modern-day birds. This would lead to the young pterosaurs being less dependent on their parents or for shorter durations and be able to fly away sooner at an earlier stage compared to how we see in modern-day birds.

Habib and Witton also went in to describe how insectivory evolved with pterosaurs, just like what is seen with Anurognathus ammoni and Dendrorhynchoides curvidentatus, and how that relates to their functional morphology. They explained that with the great locomotion and flexibility that their wings showed, Anurognathus ammoni, Dendrorhynchoides curvidentatus, and some other small species, were able to catch insects and maneuver between low areas and potentially around/under trees. When predicting the gape measurements for these small pterosaurs, they used measurements of the premaxillary tip all the way to the jaw tips and then the width between the sections as references. They predicted 1734 mm^{2} for the estimated gaps provided from the holotype of Anurognathus, Dendrorhynchoides, and Jeholopterus. The research team ended up concluding that consumed prey would have to be very small in length, around 11 mm total.

== See also ==
- Pterosaur size
- List of pterosaur genera
- Timeline of pterosaur research
