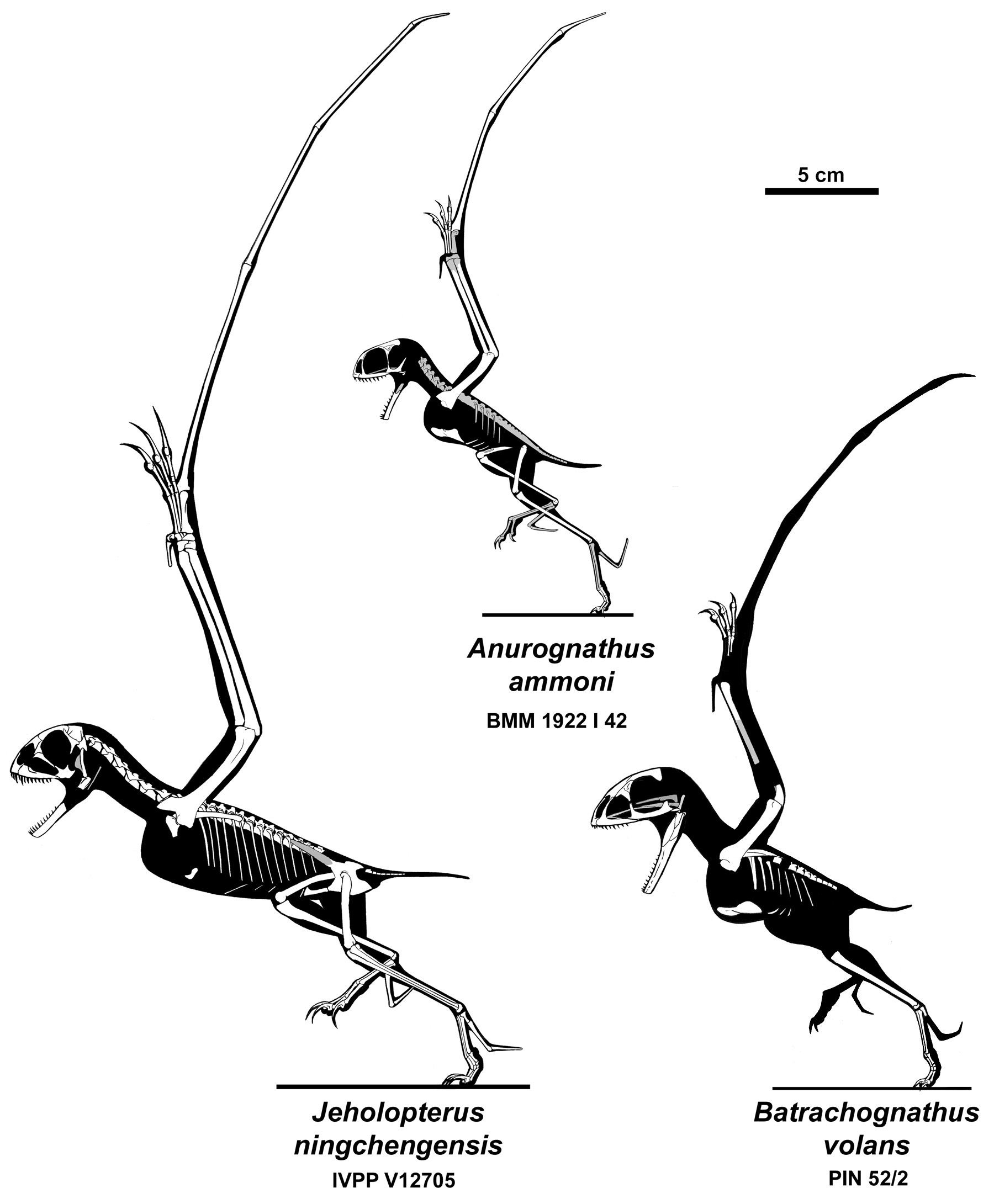
- Anurognathid skeletons to scale

Scientific classification
- Kingdom: Animalia
- Phylum: Chordata
- Class: Reptilia
- Order: †Pterosauria
- Clade: †Caelidracones
- Family: †Anurognathidae; Nopcsa, 1928

Type species
- †Anurognathus ammoni Döderlein, 1923

Subgroups
- †"Dimorphodon" weintraubi?; †Mesadactylus?; †Anurognathinae; †Anurognathus; †Dendrorhynchoides; †Jeholopterus; †Luopterus; †Vesperopterylus; †Batrachognathinae; †Batrachognathus; †Cascocauda; †Sinomacrops

= Anurognathidae =

Anurognathids Temporal range: Middle Jurassic – Early Cretaceous, 165–122.1 Ma As early as 189 Ma if "Dimorphodon" weintraubi is an anurognathid.

Family of pterosaurs from the Jurassic and Cretaceous periods

Anurognathidae is a family of small, short-tailed pterosaurs that lived in Europe, Asia, and possibly North America during the Jurassic and Cretaceous periods. Eight genera are definitively known: Anurognathus, from the Late Jurassic of Germany; Jeholopterus, Luopterus, Cascocauda and Sinomacrops, from the Middle to Late Jurassic of China; Batrachognathus, from the Late Jurassic of Kazakhstan; and Dendrorhynchoides and Vesperopterylus, from the Early Cretaceous of China. Bennett (2007) suggested that the holotype of Mesadactylus, BYU 2024, a synsacrum, belonged to an anurognathid, though this affinity has been questioned by other authors. Mesadactylus is from the Late Jurassic Morrison Formation of the United States. Indeterminate anurognathid remains have also been reported from the Middle Jurassic Bakhar Svita of Mongolia and the Early Cretaceous of North Korea. Anurognathids had wingspans of up to 900 mm.

== Classification ==
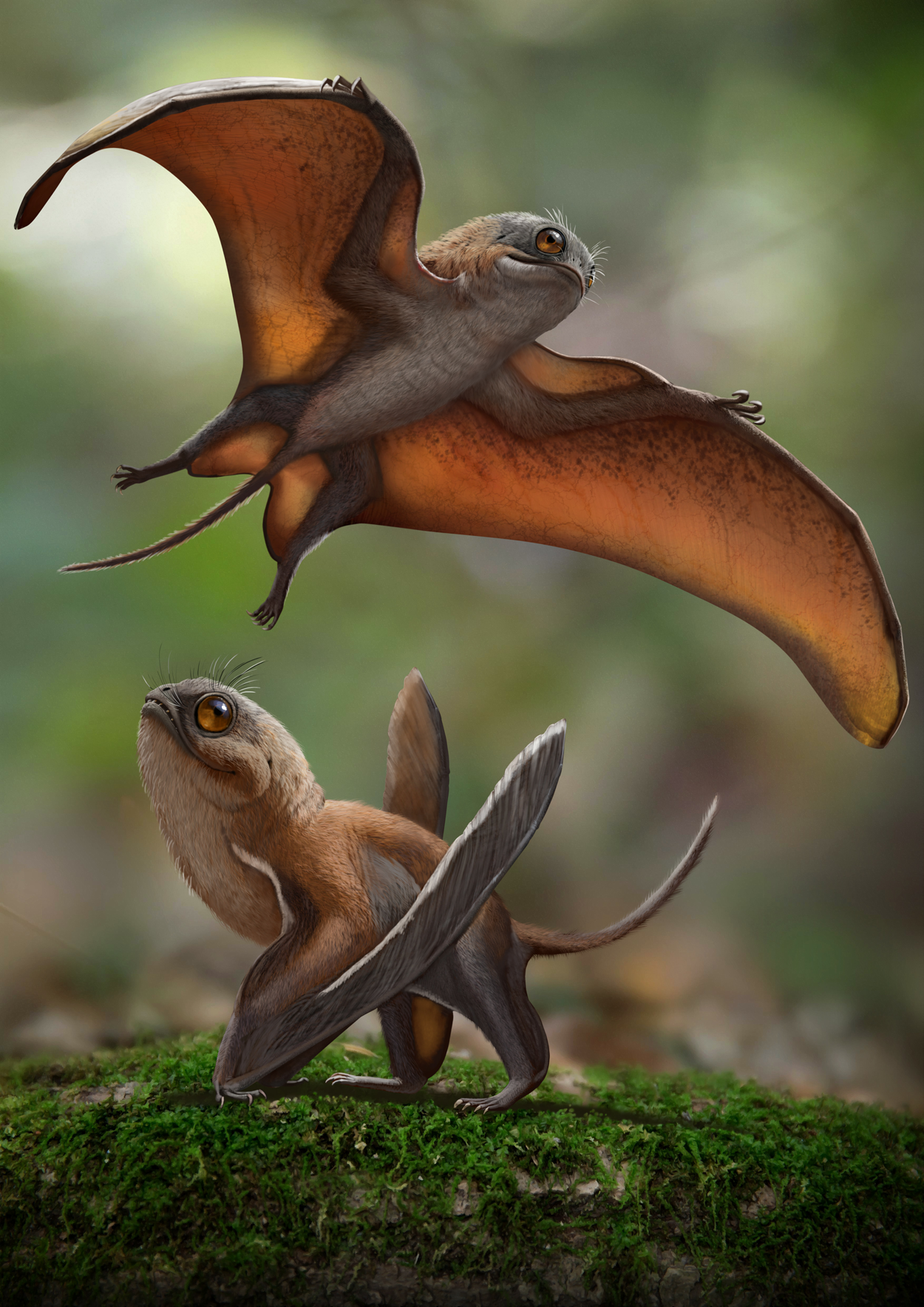
Life restoration of Sinomacrops

A family Anurognathidae was named in 1928 by Franz Nopcsa von Felső-Szilvás (as the subfamily Anurognathinae) with Anurognathus as the type genus. The family name Anurognathidae was first used by Oskar Kuhn in 1967.

The phylogeny of Anurognathidae is disputed. Both Alexander Kellner and David Unwin in 2003 defined the group as a node clade: the last common ancestor of Anurognathus and Batrachognathus and all its descendants. Some analyses, such as that of Kellner (2003), place them as the most basal group in the pterosaur tree. Unwin also recovered the group as very basal, falling between Dimorphodontidae and Campylognathoididae. However, anurognathids have some characteristics in common with the derived Pterodactyloidea, such as short and fused tail bones. More recent analyses, which include more fossils and taxa, support this observation and recover the group as substantially more derived than previously thought, but still basal to pterodactyloids. In 2010 an analysis by Brian Andres indicated the Anurognathidae and Pterodactyloidea were sister taxa. This conformed better to the fossil record because no early anurognathids were known at the time, and being the basalmost pterosaur clade would require a ghost lineage of over sixty million years. However, the reassignment of "Dimorphodon" weintraubi to a basal position within Anurognathidae helps fill this gap and suggests this group appeared earlier than previously thought, possibly in the Early Jurassic Period. Depending on where Anurognathidae falls within the Pterosauria, the existence of "Dimorphodon" weintraubi may have important implications for the timing of the evolution of major pterosaur clades, making further study of this specimen critical for pterosaur research. In 2022, a phylogenetic analysis accompanying the description of Cascocauda recovered Anurognathidae as a sister clade to Breviquartossa.

== Lifestyle ==
Anurognathids are widely believed to have been nocturnal or crepuscular akin to bats. The fact that many anurognathids have large eye sockets supports the theory of operating in low-light environments. Anurognathid teeth suggest they were largely insectivorous, though some may have had more prey choices, such as Batrachognathus and Jeholopterus, which have been hypothesized to have been piscivorous. At least some, such as Vesperopterylus, were arboreal, with claws suited for gripping tree branches.

== Feathers ==
A 2018 study of the remains of two small Jurassic-age pterosaurs from Inner Mongolia, China, named as the genus Cascocauda in 2022, found that pterosaurs had a wide array of pycnofiber shapes and structures, as opposed to the homogeneous structures that had generally been assumed to cover them. Some of these had frayed ends, very similar in structure to four different feather types known from birds or other dinosaurs but almost never known from pterosaurs prior to the study, suggesting homology. A response to this study was published in 2020, where it was suggested that the structures seen on the anurognathids were actually a result of the decomposition of aktinofibrils: a type of fibre used to strengthen and stiffen the wing. However, in a response to this, the authors of the 2018 paper point to the fact that the presence of the structures extend past the patagium, and the presence of both aktinofibrils and filaments on Jeholopterus ningchengensis and Sordes pilosus. The various forms of filament structure present on the anurognathids in the 2018 study would also require a form of decomposition that would cause the different 'filament' forms seen. They therefore conclude that the most parsimonious interpretation of the structures is that they are filamentous proto-feathers. But Liliana D'Alba points out that the description of the preserved integumentary structures on the two anurognathid specimens is still based upon gross morphology. She also points out that Pterorhynchus was described to have feathers to support the claim that feathers had a common origin with ornithodirans but was argued against by several authors. The only method to assure if it was homologous to feathers is to use a scanning electron microscope.
